= Metropolitan Railway electric multiple units =

UK trains

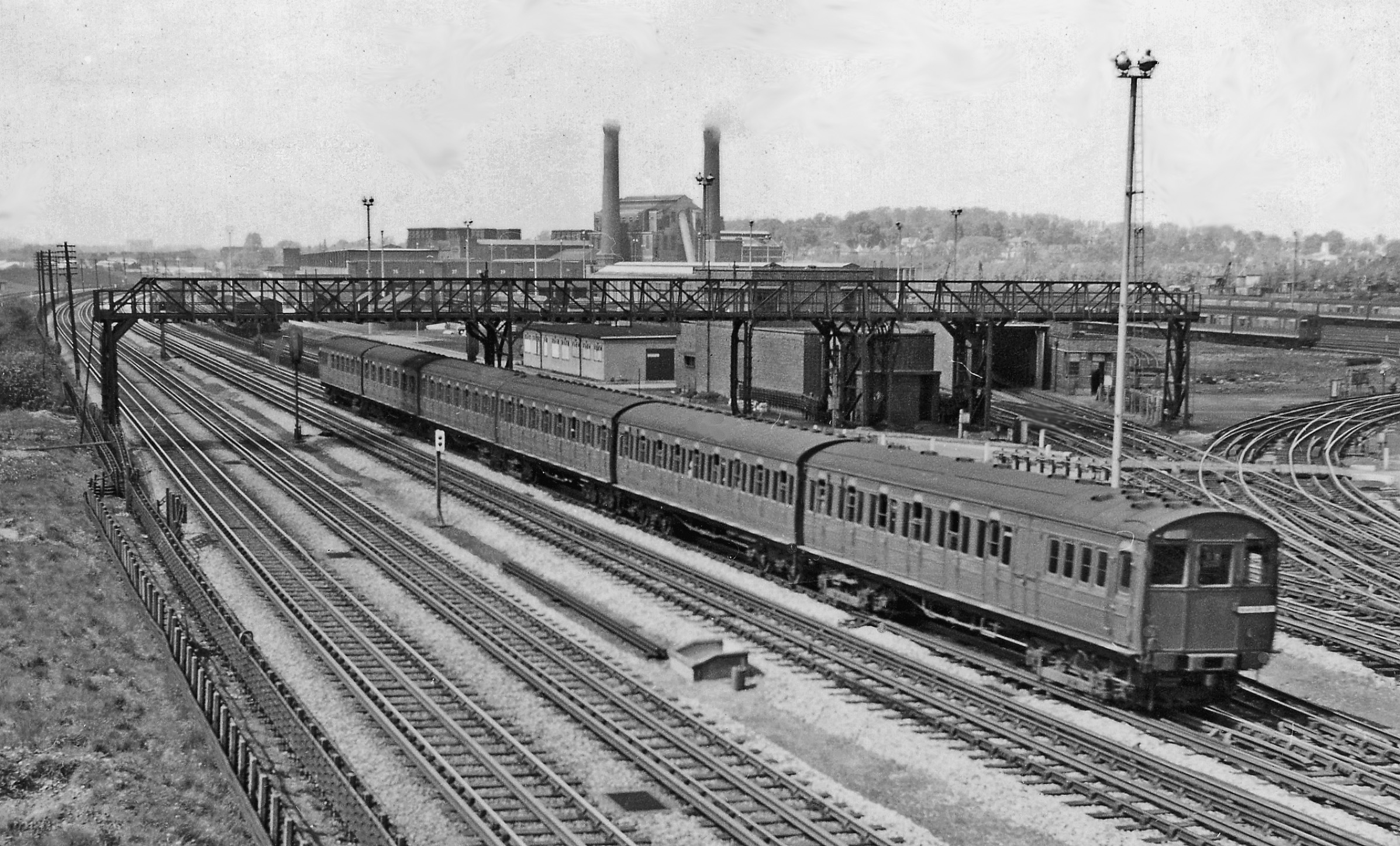
T stock multiple unit at Neasden

Metropolitan Railway electric multiple units were used on London's Metropolitan Railway after the lines were electrified in the early 20th century.

After a joint experiment with the District Railway with which they operated the inner circle in London, a four rail DC system was chosen. The first Metropolitan Railway electric multiple units ran on 1 January 1905 from Uxbridge to Baker Street, the circle service began a full electric service on 24 September 1905 and an electric service started on the joint Hammersmith and City line on 5 November 1906.

More trains were purchased in 1915 and 1921 to replace and supplement those operating the circle service. In 1927-33 compartment stock was built for use on the Extension line out of Baker Street through Harrow.

In 1933 the railway was amalgamated with the other London underground railway companies to form the London Passenger Transport Board. The older stock was withdrawn after replacement by the O Stock in the 1930s, the Circle stock was renovated and was later replaced by P Stock in 1950 and the units which ran on the Extension line were standardised and designated T Stock, and later replaced by A Stock in 1963.

== Electrification ==
The Metropolitan Railway was opened in 1863 with wooden carriages hauled by steam locomotives, but at the start of the 20th century the railway was seeing increased competition in central London from the new Underground Electric Railways of London (UERL) tube lines and the use of buses. The use of steam underground led to smoke-filled stations and carriages which was unpopular with passengers, and conversion to electric traction was seen as the way forward.

Because of the jointly operated Inner Circle co-operation with the District Railway was essential. A jointly owned experimental train of six coaches was tested on passenger service on an Earl's Court to High Street Kensington shuttle in 1900. Composed of four trailers and two motor cars this had pick up shoes which made contact with conductor rails energised at 600 V DC on both sides of the track. Although the motor cars were connected by a bus line, there was no multiple working, meaning only the leading motor car was powered.

The experiment was considered a success, and following tenders a 3000V AC system was recommended by the electrification joint committee, and this was accepted by both parties until the American led UERL took control of the District. The group was led by Charles Yerkes, whose experience in the United States led him to favour DC, with conductor rail similar to that in use on the City & South London Railway and Central London Railway. After arbitration by the Board of Trade a DC system with four rails was taken up and the railways began electrifying their routes, using multiple-unit stock and electric locomotives hauling carriages.

== Early units ==
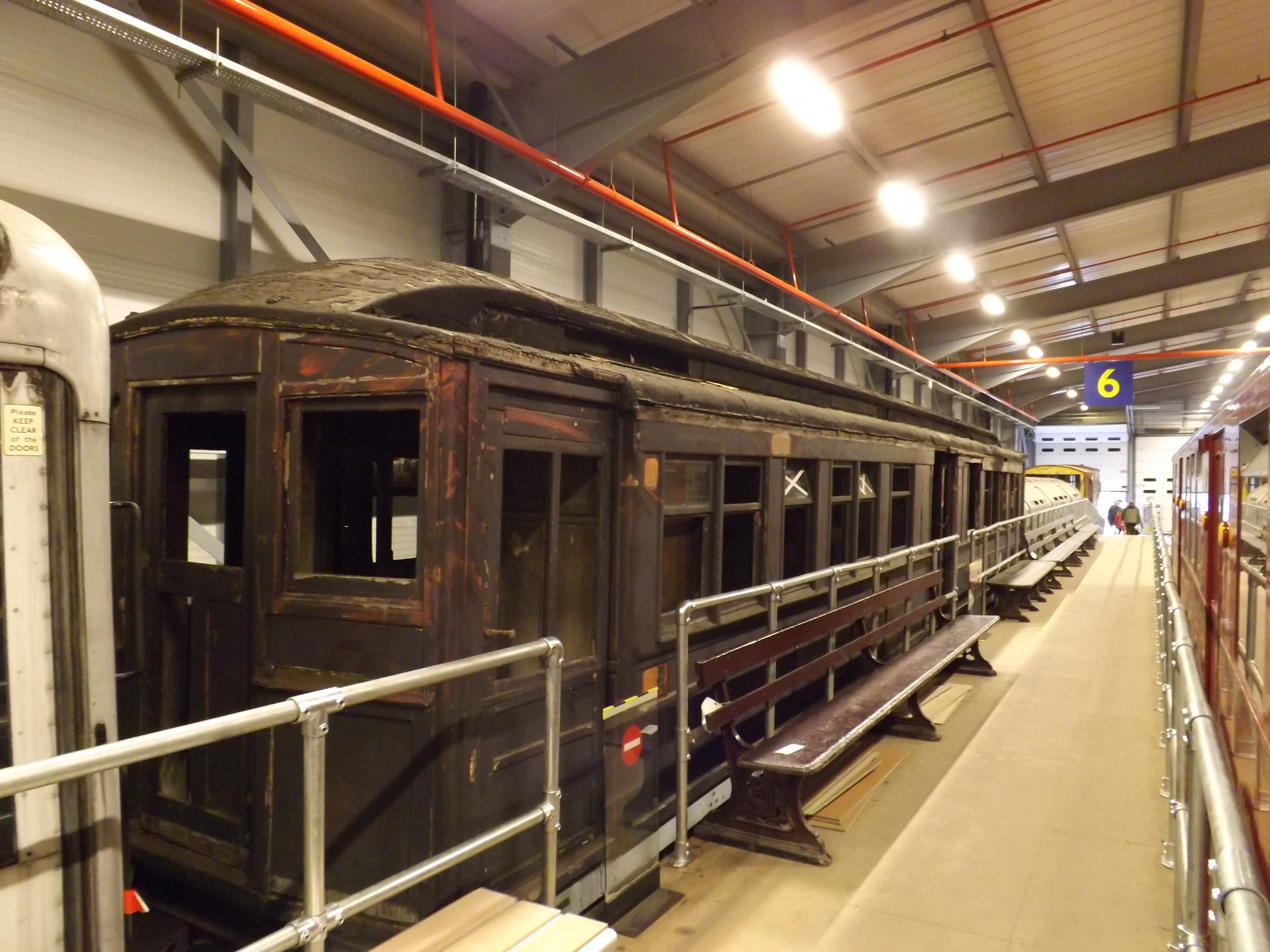
A badly fire damaged trailer built in 1904–05 is in store at LTM's Acton Depot

The first order was placed with Metropolitan Amalgamated in 1902 for 50 trailers and 20 motor cars, which were intended to run as ten 7-car trains, although due to problems with platform lengths these ran as 6-car trains. They were open saloon cars with access at the ends via open lattice gates. The units had two motor cars which were equipped with Westinghouse electric equipment and four 150 hp (110 kW) motors, and ran off-peak as 3-car units with a motor car and a driving trailer. Twenty 6-cars trains were ordered for the Hammersmith & City line that the Met jointly operated with the Great Western Railway with Thomson-Houston equipment (BTH) and GE76 150 hp motors. In 1904 an order was placed for a further 36 motor cars and 62 trailers with an option for a further 20 motor cars and 40 trailers. However problems with the Westinghouse equipment (BWE) meant when the option was taken up Thomson-Houston equipment (BTH) was specified, but more powerful 200 hp (150 kW) GE69 motors were fitted.

The first electric multiple units ran on 1 January 1905 from Uxbridge to Baker Street, the Uxbridge branch having opened in July 1904 and worked by steam for six months. After problems with the Metropolitan shoegear on the District Railway were solved the inner circle began a full electric service on 24 September 1905, reducing the travel time from seventy to fifty minutes, and an electric service started on the Hammersmith and City line on 5 November 1906.

The trains had first and third class accommodation with electric lighting and heating. However, it was quickly found that the lattice gates left the coach ends exposed when working in the open and the cars were modified with vestibules from 1906. Having access only from the end of the coaches was a problem on the busy circle line and centre sliding doors were added from 1911. Up to 1918 the motor cars with the more powerful GE69 motors were used on the Circle line with three trailers.

In 1910 two motor cars were modified with driving cabs at both ends. One had 150 BWE equipment and the other 150 BTH, and they started work on the Uxbridge shuttle service, before being transferred to the Addison Road shuttle in 1918. From 1925 to 1934 these vehicles worked between Watford and Rickmansworth.

== GN&C Stock ==
In 1913 the Metropolitan bought the Great Northern and City Railway which ran from Finsbury Park directly into the City of London at Moorgate. It operated with electric multiple units and the original GN&C Stock operated on the line between 1904 and 1939.

== M and N Stock ==
Following electrification there were surplus carriages. The Ashbury bogie stock had been built recently and from 1906 some of these carriages were converted into multiple units. Initially two 4-car rakes were converted by fitting control equipment and cabs to run with 150 BWE motor cars. It was found these were underpowered and the carriages were modified to use the more powerful 200 BTH motor cars. In 1907 these motor cars were needed on the inner circle services so four bogie carriages were converted into motor cars using 150 BWE equipment to make 2 x 6-car units. These were known as N stock and used on Uxbridge services until 1932 when they were reduced to four car units and transferred to the Stanmore branch.

Two M stock 7-car units were built from Ashbury bogie stock by fitting control equipment and cabs and 200 BTH and GE 69 motors and these were later lengthened to 8-car by adding another carriage.

== Circle Stock ==
In 1913 the Metropolitan needed additional stock to serve the East London Railway, and it had introduced through running at Baker Street. An order was placed for 23 motor cars and 20 trailers, saloon cars with sliding doors at the ends and the middle. All motor cars were ordered with 200 BWE equipment, but ten were installed on the electric locomotives and thirteen motor cars entered service with 200 BWE equipment and ten with 200 BTH equipment with GE69 motors, and worked with earlier stock on the circle and mainline services.

In 1921 the electric equipment was replaced on the locomotives and the 200 BWE and 86M traction motors recovered were fitted to 20 new motor cars. These were ordered with 33 trailers and 6 first class driving trailers with three pairs of double sliding doors down both sides, and introduced on circle services.

After London Underground was formed in 1933 the Circle stock was renovated, painted in a red and cream livery and the traction motors replaced a year later at Acton Works. All had been withdrawn by 31 December 1950 after being replaced by O Stock.

== W, MV & MW stock ==
In 1927–33 multiple unit compartment stock was built in batches by Metropolitan Carriage and Wagon and Birmingham Carriage and Wagon to be used on electric services from Baker Street and the city to Watford and Rickmansworth. The first order was only for motor cars; half had Westinghouse brakes, Metro-Vickers control systems and four MV153 motors rated at 275 horsepower (205 kW); they replaced the motor cars working with bogie stock trailers in the 'W' units. The rest of the motor cars had the same motor equipment but used vacuum brakes instead, and worked with converted Dreadnoughts of the 1920/23 batches to form 'MV' units. The 'MW' stock was ordered in 1929, 30 motor coaches and 25 trailers similar to the 'MV' units, but with Westinghouse brakes to make five 7-car trains. A further batch of 'MW' stock was ordered in 1931, this time from Birmingham Railway Carriage & Wagon Company. This was to make 7 × 8-coach trains, and included additional trailers to increase the previous 'MW' batch to 8-coaches. These had GEC WT545 motors, and although designed to work in multiple with the MV153, this did not work well in practice.

After the Metropolitan Railway became part of London Underground, the MV stock was fitted with Westinghouse brakes and the cars with GEC engines regeared to allow these to work in multiple with the MV153 engined cars. In 1938 9 × 8-coach and 10 × 6-coach MW units were redesignated London Underground T Stock. This was replaced by the A Stock, with the final train running on 5 October 1962. The Spa Valley Railway is home to two T-Stock carriages.

P Stock was ordered to replace the remaining Metropolitan multiple units. A combination of 3-car units and 2-car units to run in six and eight car lengths were delivered from July 1939. Two trailers were included in an eight car formation, but these were designed to allow conversion to motor cars at a later date after improvements to the power supply. F Stock trains had been built for the District Railway in the early 1920s. In the 1950s a number became available for use on the Metropolitan line and mainly worked the semi-fast Harrow and Uxbridge services and ran on the East London line as modified four-car sets.

== Stock transferred to the London Underground ==
In 1933 when the Metropolitan amalgamated with the other London underground railway companies to form the London Passenger Transport Board it operated with the following stock.

Class	Number	Formation	Motor cars	Comments
MV	3	7-car	1927	Compartment stock
MW	12	8-car	1927/30/31	Compartment stock
W	5		1927/30/31	bogie stock trailer
VT	5; 3	8-car 7-car	1927/30/31	
S	1	8-car	Experimental train	
V	12	7-car	200 BWE; 200 BTH	Saloon
M	2	8-car	200 BTH	Bogie stock conversion
N	2	4-car	150 BWE	Bogie stock conversion
H&C	23	6-car	Original 1906 H&C stock and 3 trains transferred from Met	
Circle	18	5-car	BTH; BWE	
