= London Underground Circle Stock =

British rolling stock

Circle Stock
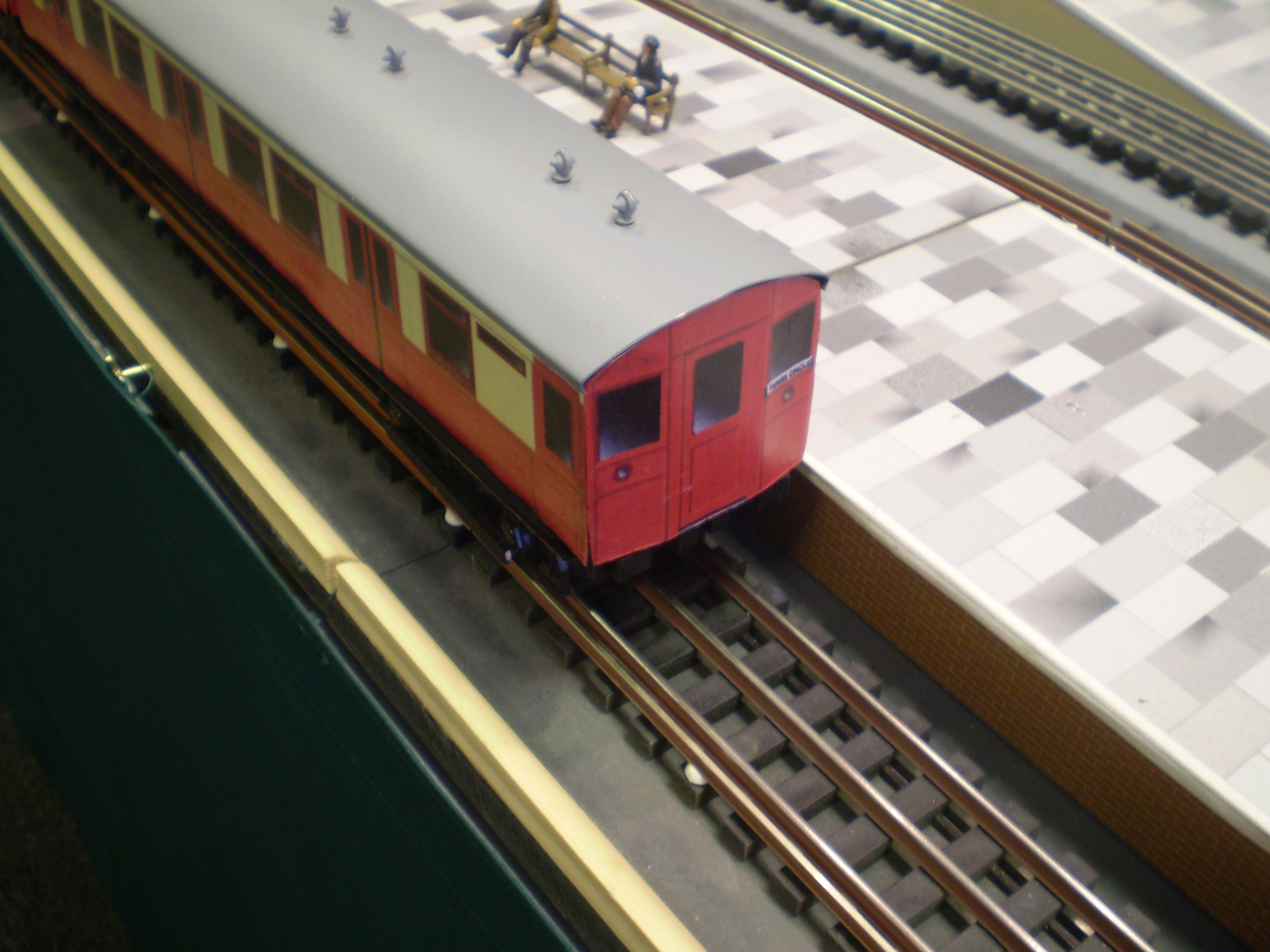
- Model of Circle Stock
- Stock type: Subsurface
- In service: 1934 - 1950
- Refurbished: 1933-1934 at Acton Works
- Scrapped: 48 in 1950, 42 in 1951
- Formation: 5 car; DMx2, CTx2, Tx1
- Fleet numbers: 2561-2596, 6536-6553, 9546-9581

Specifications
- Bogies: 10

The London Underground Circle Stock consisted of 90 cars renovated in 1934 at Acton Works, selected by the LPTB from earlier Metropolitan Railway stock - 59 of which dated from 1921 but four were 1905 clerestory roofed cars. The vehicles were externally repainted in a red-and-cream livery at first; later all-red.

The 90 cars were 36 Driving Motors (DM), 36 trailers, and 18 control trailers (CT), running in 5-car trains for a 14 train service (seven for each route). The control trailers had their driving equipment removed, but were needed in the formation as they had the first class accommodation. Included in renovation undertaken at Acton works was the installation of communicating doors in the car ends, reupholstering, removal of luggage compartments on DM cars, installing standard light fittings and repainting in its new livery.

They were finally withdrawn on 31 December 1950, being replaced by 5-car trains of P Stock, which had previously been used on the Uxbridge branch of the Metropolitan Line. Disposals started in Oct 1950.

== Fleet details ==
- Car 2564 was damaged beyond repair in a collision at Charing Cross, now known as Embankment, on 17 May 1938. The car was scrapped on 22 June 1939 and replaced by car 2552 which was a 1913 stock car numbered 105. The bogies and motors from 2564 was transferred to the replacement car.
- Car 2589 was destroyed by enemy action at Kings Cross on 9 March 1941. It was scrapped on 2 May 1941 and replaced by car 2558, a 1905 stock car previously numbered 68.

Circle Stock Fleet Details
Driving Motor Cars						Control Trailers			Trailer Cars					
Year	Met Railway No.	London Transport No.	Year	Met Railway No.	London Transport No.	Year	Met Railway No.	London Transport No.	Year	Met Railway No.	London Transport No.	Year	Met Railway No.	London Transport No.
1921	106	2561	1921	114	2579	1905	51	6536	1913	77	9546	1921	102	9564
1921	107	2562	1921	115	2580	1905	47	6537	1913	78	9547	1921	103	9565
1921	116	2563	1913	93	2581	1905	49	6538	1913	79	9548	1921	104	9566
1921	117	2564	1913	94	2582	1921	90	6539	1921	87	9549	1921	105	9567
1921	118	2565	1913	95	2583	1921	91	6540	1921	88	9550	1921	106	9568
1921	119	2566	1913	96	2584	1921	92	6541	1921	89	9551	1921	107	9569
1921	120	2567	1913	97	2585	1905	46	6542	1921	90	9552	1921	108	9570
1921	121	2568	1913	98	2586	1913	79	6543	1921	91	9553	1921	109	9571
1921	122	2569	1913	83	2587	1913	80	6544	1921	92	9554	1921	110	9572
1921	123	2570	1913	84	2588	1913	81	6545	1921	93	9555	1921	111	9573
1921	124	2571	1913	85	2589	1913	82	6546	1921	94	9556	1921	112	9574
1921	125	2572	1913	86	2590	1913	83	6547	1921	95	9557	1921	113	9575
1921	108	2573	1913	87	2591	1913	84	6548	1921	96	9558	1921	114	9576
1921	109	2574	1913	88	2592	1913	85	6549	1921	97	9559	1921	115	9577
1921	110	2575	1913	89	2593	1913	86	6550	1921	98	9560	1921	116	9578
1921	111	2576	1913	90	2594	1921	87	6551	1921	99	9561	1921	117	9579
1921	112	2577	1913	91	2595	1921	88	6552	1921	100	9562	1921	118	9580
1921	113	2578	1913	92	2596	1921	89	6553	1921	101	9563	1921	119	9581
