= London Underground 1915 Stock =

Class of English train rolling stock

- Stock type: Deep-level tube
- Manufacturer: Brush
- Line served: Central line

Twenty-four 1915 Tube Stock driving motor cars were built by Brush for the Central London Railway's extension from Wood Lane to Ealing Broadway. No trailer cars were built as part of the stock.

The extension was not completed until 1917 and operation did not start until 1920 so the cars were initially transferred to the Bakerloo tube for use on the Watford extension, for which they were fitted with contact shoes for the 4th rail.

Once returned to the Central, cars were not compatible with the 1903 tube stock. Because of this the different stock were given nicknames, the 1915 stock became known as the 'Ealing Stock' while the 1903 stock became known as 'Tunnel Stock' or 'Local Stock'. As no trailer cars had been built several 1900 stock trailers were modified to run with them.
