= London Underground sleet locomotives =

London Underground de-icing locomotives

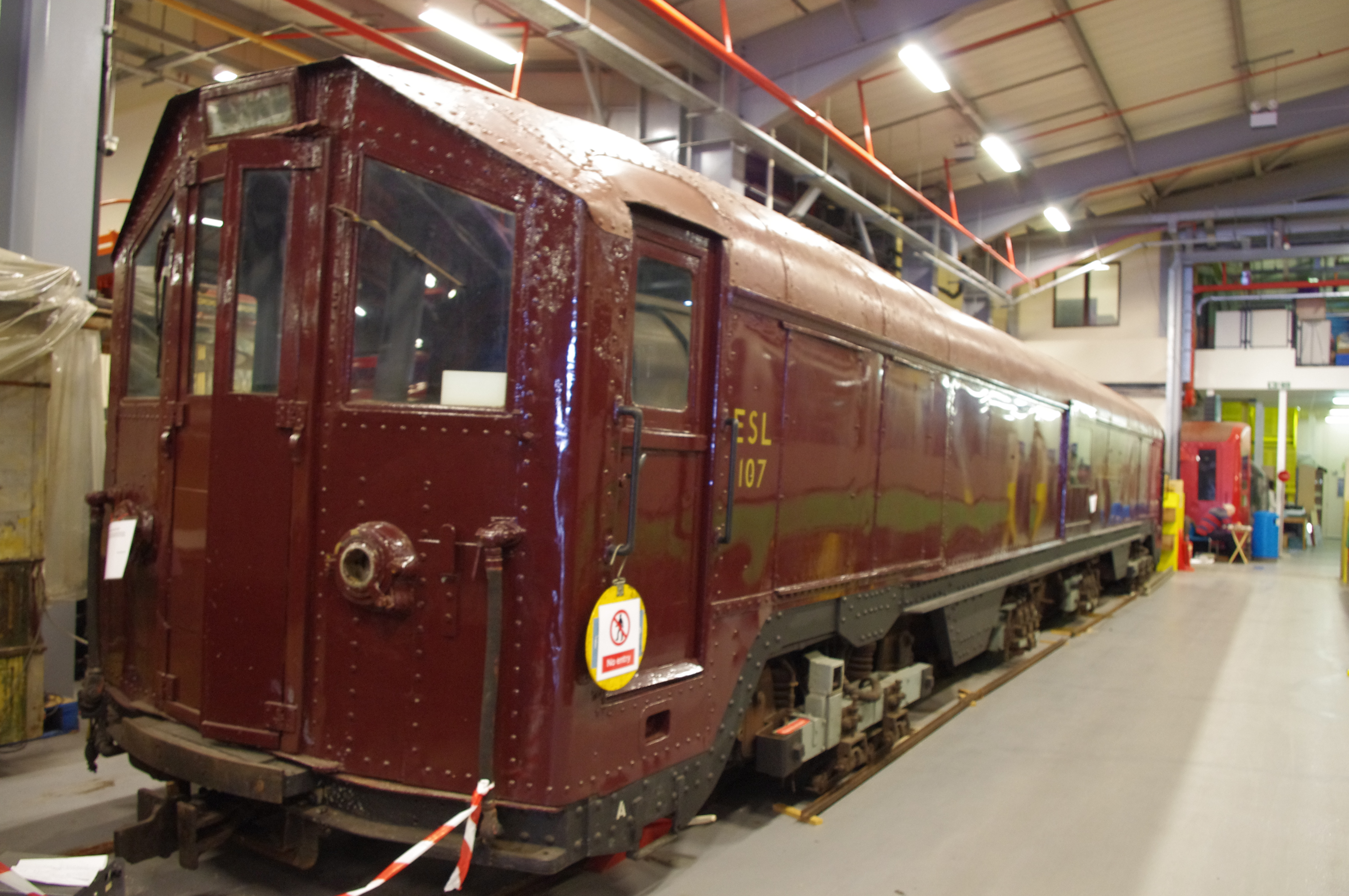
- Sleet locomotive ESL107 at the London Transport Museum
- Operators: London Underground

Specifications
- Electric system(s): DC Fourth rail
- Current collection: Contact shoe

Sleet locomotives were redundant London Underground cars converted to help with the removal of ice that built up on the conductor rails. The main batch of eighteen tube-gauge locomotives were built between 1938 and 1941 from motor cars originally built in 1903. They were refurbished in the 1960s using equipment removed from redundant T-stock vehicles, and were joined by a pair of surface-gauge locomotives in 1961.

In addition to de-icing duties, some of them were used for experiments in clearing leaves from the running rails. They all ceased to operate by 1985. One of the tube-gauge locomotives went to the London Transport Museum, and the surface-gauge cars went to the Spa Valley Railway.

== ESL100 - ESL117 ==
ESL100 - ESL117
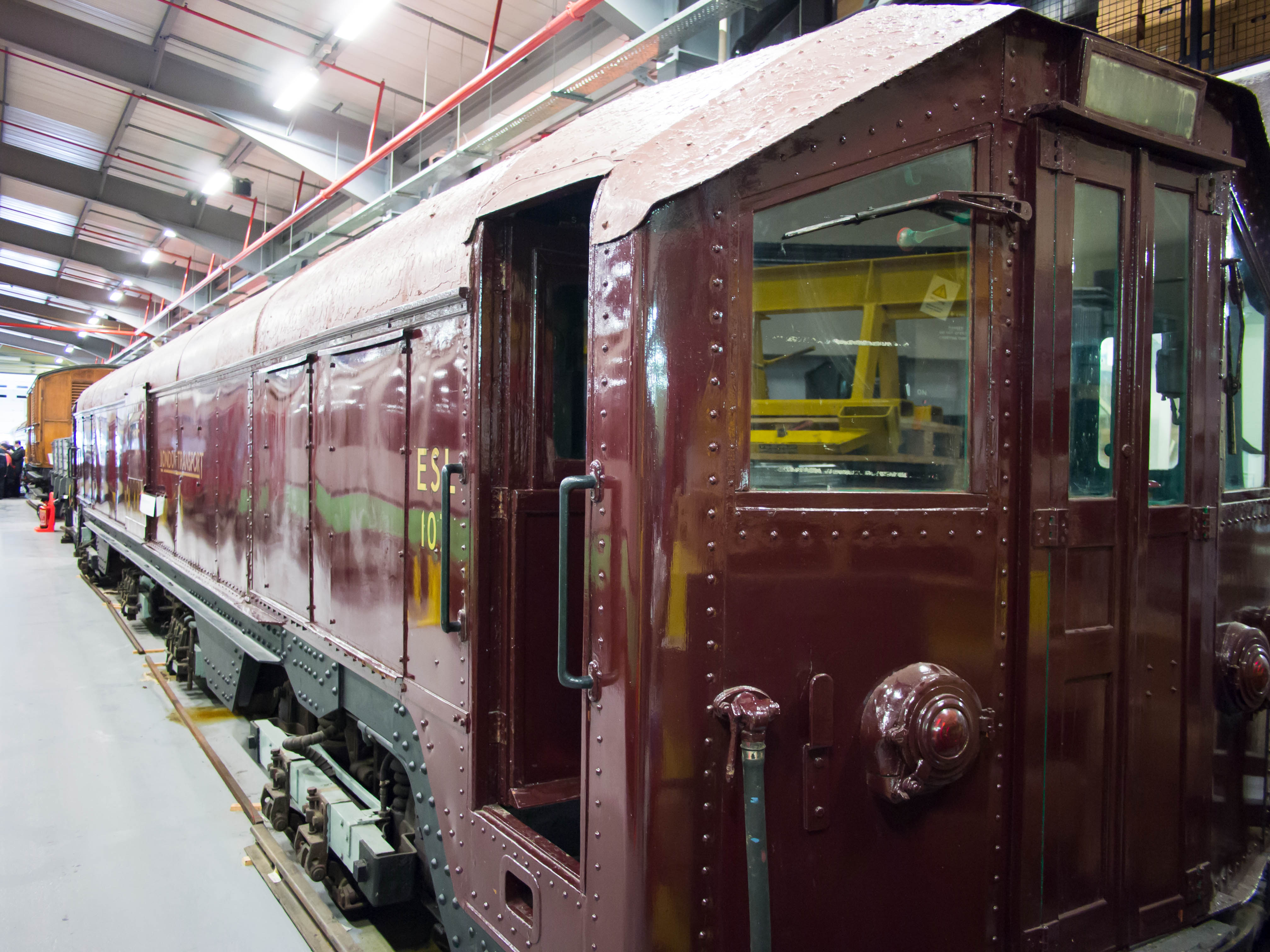
- ESL107 at the London Transport Museum

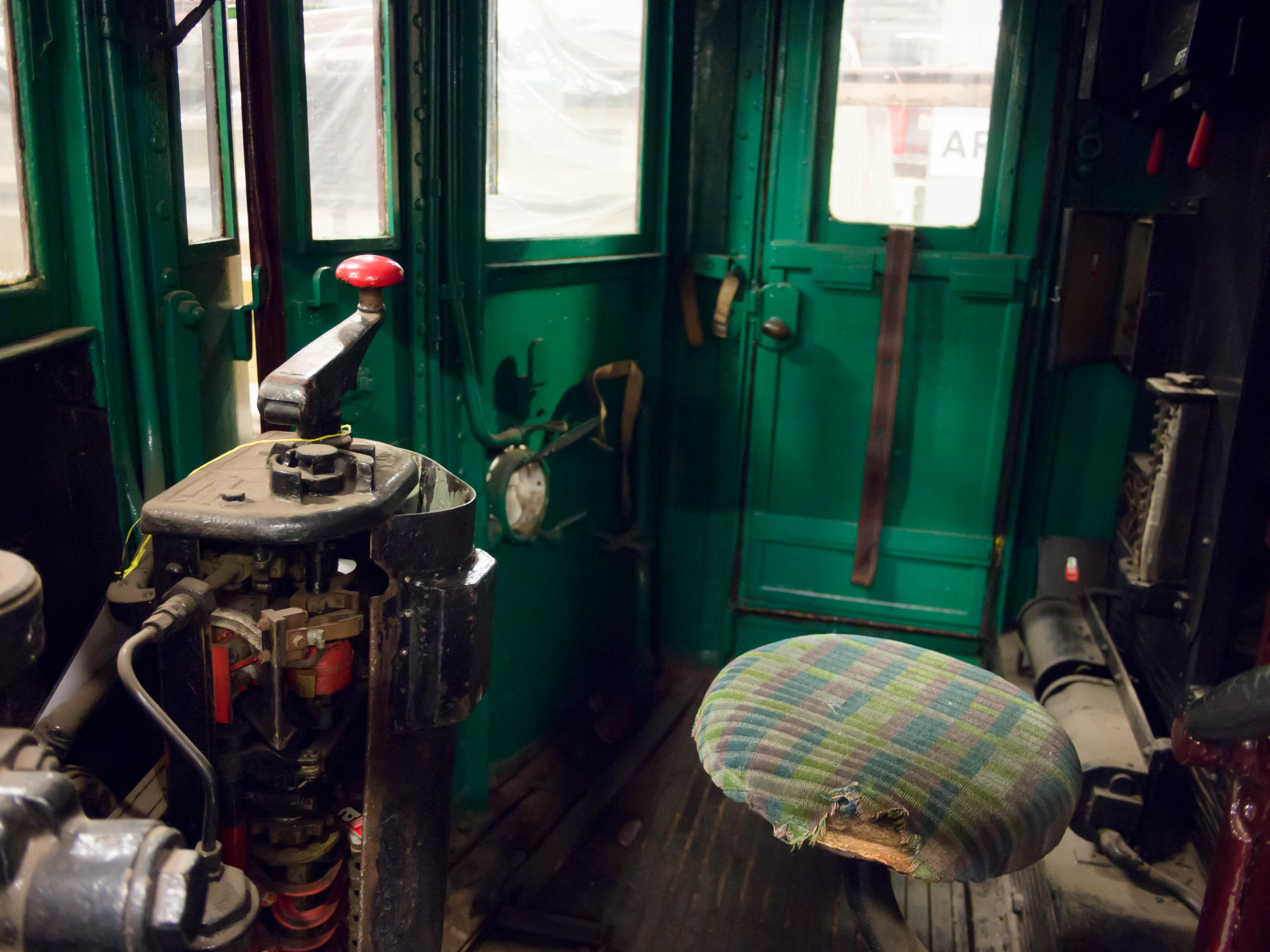
- The cab interior of ESL107
- Stock type: Deep-level tube
- In service: 1938-1985
- Constructed: 1938-1941
- Number built: 18 units
- Fleet numbers: ESL100 - ESL117
- Operators: London Underground

Specifications
- Train length: 15,320 mm (50 ft 3 in)
- Width: 2,570 mm (8 ft 5 in)
- Height: 2,900 mm (9 ft 6 in)
- Traction motors: (2) GE66
- Power output: 125 hp (93 kW) per motor
- Electric system(s): DC Fourth rail
- Current collection: Contact shoe

Following the start of the 1935/40 Programme, which included large scale stock replacement, a number of motor cars from the Central London Railway became available. Forty cars, all built in 1903/4, were set aside for conversion into sleet locomotives. Each was built from a pair of motor cars. The front sections were cut off, to the rear of the front bogie, and were joined back to back to a new central section. The process began in 1938, and the first locomotive was ready for a trial run on 22 December.

It was 38 feet (12 m) long, carried a single de-icing bogie under the centre of the car, and was numbered ESL100. There were teething problems with the design, as it was too short to bridge some of the gaps in the conductor rails, and so subsequent conversions were 50 feet (15 m) long and included two de-icing bogies. By 1941, 18 locomotives had been built, and this number was deemed adequate.

The de-icing bogies carried ice-cutters, which were held against the current rail by a compressed air cylinder. Each had a rotating head with ridged steel rollers, to break up the ice. Sleet brushes with metal prongs were mounted either side of the cutter, so that the rail was swept before and after cutting, whichever way the locomotive was moving. Anti-freeze was applied to the rail by spray nozzles, supplied from two 75 imperial gallons (340 L) tanks mounted in the central section, and accessible through a sliding door.

Two operators were required, one to drive and the other to operate valves, so that when the current rail changed sides, the application of anti-freeze followed. In 1955, the process was upgraded, and the detection of the current rail was made automatic. When there was no rail, the sprays shut down, as they also did when the locomotive stopped.

As built, the sleet locomotives were fitted with GE66 motors, which were prone to flash over. This was a particular problem when the motors were switched from series to parallel mode. In order to mitigate this, the controllers were arranged so that the motors were permanently wired in series, and could not be switched to parallel mode. This limited the maximum speed, but they needed to run fairly slowly to ensure that the anti-freeze was adequately applied, and the fact that they did not need to stop at stations meant that they could be run between service trains on most lines without disrupting the timetable.

In 1962, London Transport started to scrap the T stock cars from the Metropolitan line. Electro-pneumatic motor controllers were removed from them to be fitted into the sleet locomotives. At the same time, the galvanised iron pipes which delivered the anti-freeze to the nozzles were replaced by plastic piping, which did not corrode and cause blockages, as the iron piping did. The traction motors could not be upgraded due to the limited clearances in the bogies.

Locomotive ESL103 was scrapped in 1954 as the result of collision damage sustained in 1948. It was deemed to be beyond economical repair. Gradually, de-icing gear was fitted to service trains, beginning with the A stock on the Metropolitan line, and the need for separate sleet locomotives decreased. ESL100 and ESL112 were modified in 1972, so that they could be used to remove leaves from the running rails. Experiments were made to find a suitable fluid which would assist adhesion, but none was found. The two locomotives continued to be used for brushing leaves from the rails. The vehicles were last used in August 1985. ESL107 was the last to be withdrawn, and was preserved by the London Transport Museum.

Number	Ex	Location
ESL100	3960, 3985	Scrapped 14 Oct 1982
ESL101	3958*, 3983	Scrapped 25 Apr 1984
ESL102	3990, 3997	Scrapped 12 Apr 1984
ESL103	3976, 3979	Scrapped, 11 May 1954
ESL104	3971, 3980	Scrapped 13 Apr 1984
ESL105	3952*, 3965	Scrapped 9 Sep 1982
ESL106	3984, 3993	Scrapped 13 Apr 1984
ESL107	3944*, 3981	London Transport Museum, Covent Garden
ESL108	3989, 3992	Scrapped 12 Apr 1984
ESL109	3968, 3972	Scrapped 24 Oct 1975
ESL110	3987, 3994	Scrapped 28 Oct 1975
ESL111	3956*, 3959*	Scrapped 16 Sep 1982
ESL112	3945*, 3950*	Scrapped Jun 1981
ESL113	3962, 3969	Scrapped 19 Jul 1980
ESL114	3967, 3970	Scrapped 26 Apr 1984
ESL115	3982, 3991	Scrapped 24 Oct 1975
ESL116	3953*, 3964	Scrapped 12 Oct 1982
ESL117	3954*, 3995	Scrapped

Cars marked * were built by Metropolitan Amalgamated, all other built by Birmingham Carriage & Wagon

== ESL118A / ESL118B ==
ESL118A / ESL118B
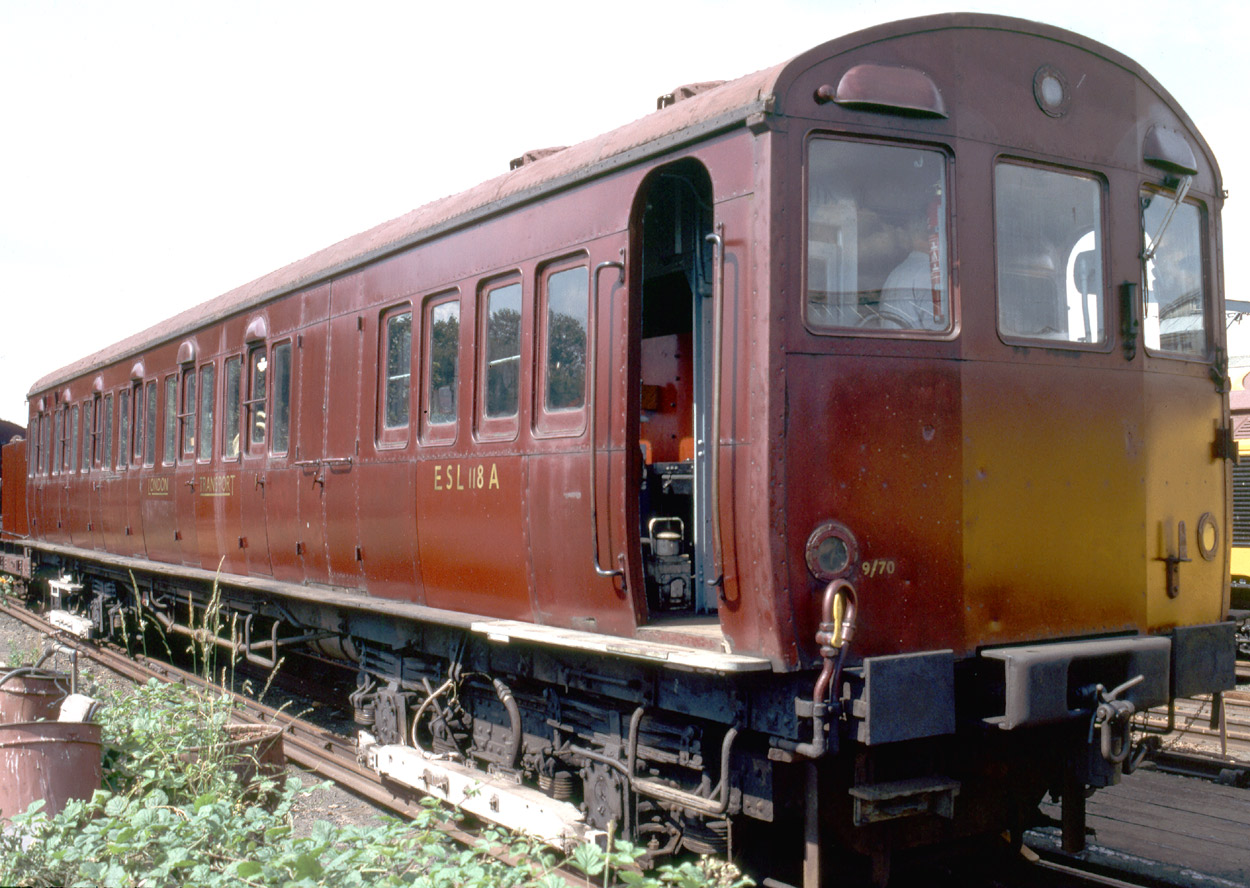
- T stock sleet locomotive ESL118A at the Acton Works open day in 1983
- Stock type: Subsurface
- In service: 1961 - 1980
- Manufacturer: Birmingham RC&W
- Constructed: 1961
- Number built: 2 units
- Fleet numbers: ESL118A/ESL118B

Specifications
- Car length: 55 ft 5 in (16.89 m)
- Traction motors: GEC WT545
- Electric system(s): 630 V DC Fourth rail
- Current collection: Contact shoe

For the surface lines, two T Stock cars were converted into sleet locomotives in 1961. They were permanently coupled together, and never ran independently. The de-icing equipment was fitted to the inner motor bogies, rather than being carried by separate bogies as on the tube-sized sleet locomotives. The cars were renumbered ESL118A and ESL118B, previously being 2758 and 2749 respectively.

The locomotives were part of a leaf clearing experiment between 1978 and 1979, when they were marshalled into a train containing a brake van, a flat car, and Metropolitan electric locomotive Sarah Siddons. The flat car had two 2,000-imperial-gallon (9,100 L) water tanks and a Merlin bus engine mounted on it, which was used to spray water at high pressure onto the running rails. L149, a ballast motor car, replaced the sleet locomotives in 1979.

In 1980, the flat truck was coupled between ESL118A and ESL118B to form a leaf cleaning train, and the high-pressure sprays were augmented by a mixture of sand and chromium or stainless steel granules, which was applied to the rails in a gel to improve adhesion. The metal granules ensured that the track signalling circuits continued to operate. After being withdrawn, both cars were preserved and are located at the Buckinghamshire Railway Centre, Quainton Road.

== Sleet tender ST1 / ST2 ==
In 1957, two experimental sleet tenders, numbered ST1 and ST2, were built at Acton Works, for testing on the Piccadilly line. One tender was attached to the front of a regular tube train while the other was attached to the rear. The tenders were low so as not to obstruct the driver's view. The experiment was not a success, because the signalling had accurately positioned block joints, which operated train stops. The extra length of the train with the tenders attached would have required significant alterations to the signalling system, and the advent of de-icing gear attached to regular service trains followed soon afterwards.
