= The Grove tube station =

Unbuilt London Underground station

The Grove
- Location of The Grove in Greater London
- Location: Shepherd's Bush
- Owner: Never built
- Number of platforms: 2

Railway companies
- Original company: Central London Railway

Other information
- Coordinates: 51.501822°N 0.228687°W

The Grove was an authorised underground railway station planned by the Central London Railway (CLR) but never built. It was to be located at the junction of Hammersmith Grove and Goldhawk Road in Shepherd's Bush, in west London.

== Plan ==
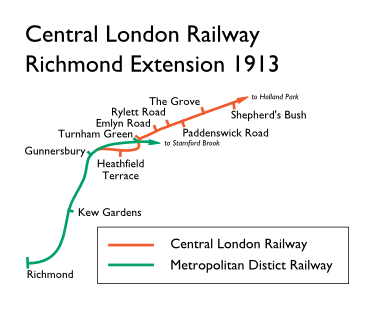
Route of the CLR extension planned in 1913

The station was to have been built on the CLR's planned underground extension from Shepherd's Bush to Gunnersbury proposed to parliament in November 1912. The extension was to continue on the London and South Western Railway (L&SWR) surface tracks to Richmond already used by the District Railway (DR). The station would have been between Paddenswick Road to the west and Shepherd's Bush to the east.

The CLR received permission for the extension on 15 August 1913 in the Central London Railway Act, 1913.

World War I prevented the works from commencing and the permission expired. In 1919, the CLR revived the plan for an extension to Richmond using a different route via the existing L&SWR/DR tracks to the south. Parliamentary approval for the new route was received in 1920, but again the works were not carried out.

== Notes ==
Abandoned Plans
Preceding station	London Underground	Following station
Paddenswick Road towards Richmond	Central line (1913)	Shepherd's Bush towards Liverpool Street
