= London Underground 1900 and 1903 Stock =

British electric rolling stock

Central London Railway Stock
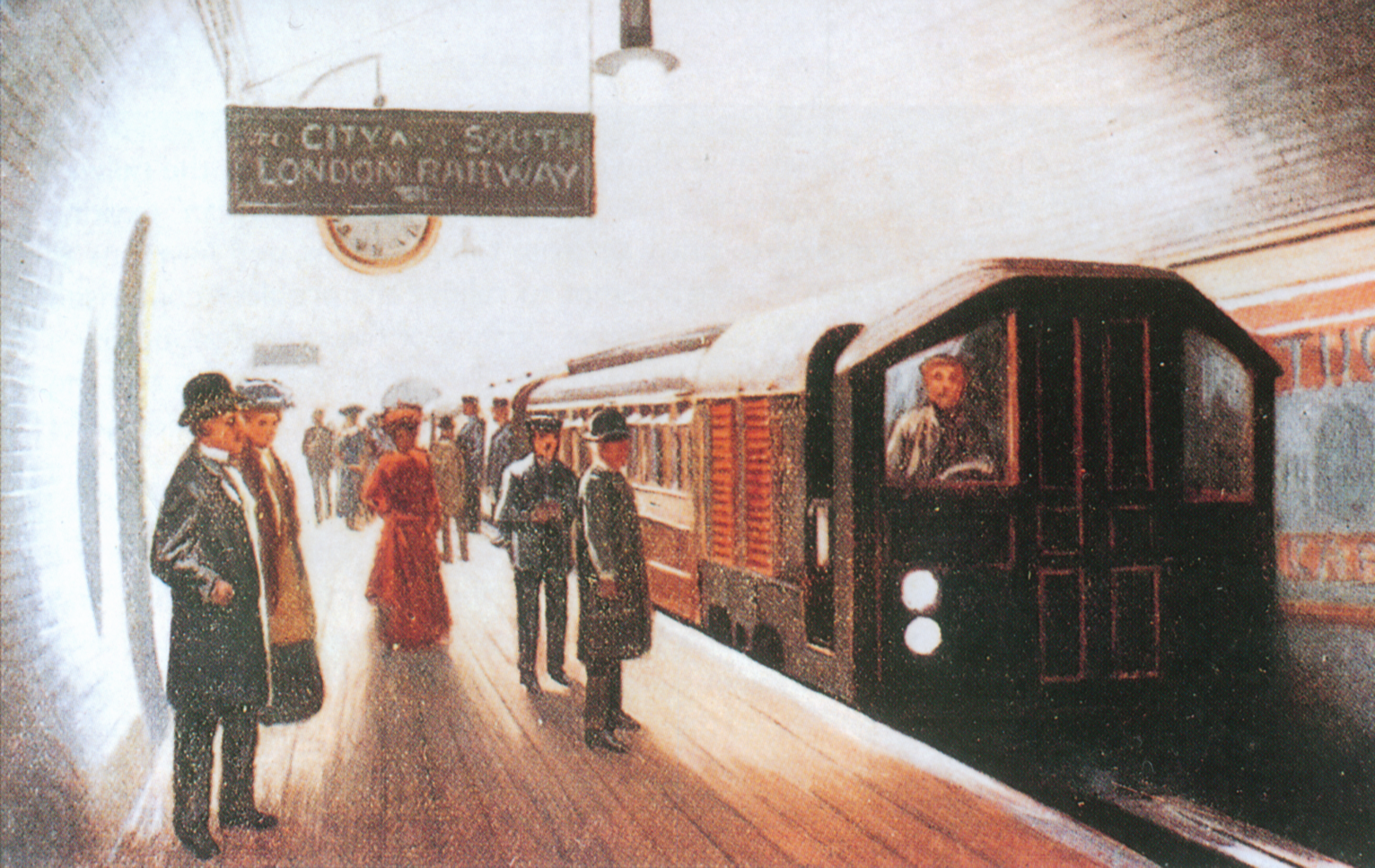
- Stock type: Deep-level tube
- In service: 1900–1939
- Manufacturer: BRC&W; Metro-Cammell

Specifications
- Car length: 45 ft 6 in (13.87 m)
- Width: 8 ft 6 in (2.59 m)
- Height: 9 ft 4.5 in (2.858 m)

The Central London Railway Stock were electric multiple units composed of trailers that had been converted from carriages designed to be hauled by electric locomotives with new motor cars. The Central London Railway opened in 1900 with electric locomotives hauling wooden carriages, but the heavy locomotives caused vibrations that could be felt in the buildings above the route. It was found that conversion to electric multiple units solved the problem, so new motor cars were bought and replaced all the locomotives by June 1903. Trains normally ran with six-cars, four trailers and two motor-cars. Some trailers were equipped with control equipment to allow trains to be formed with three cars.

Work started in 1912 on an extension to Ealing Broadway, and new more powerful motor cars were ordered. These arrived in 1915, but completion of the extension was delayed due to the outbreak of World War I, and the cars were stored. In 1917, they were lent to the Bakerloo line, where they ran on the newly opened extension to Watford Junction. They returned in 1920–1921 when, formed with trailers converted from the original stock, they became the Ealing Stock.

In 1925–1928 the trains were reconstructed, replacing the gated ends with air-operated doors, allowing the number of guards to be reduced to two. After reconstruction of the Central London Railway tunnels, the trains were replaced by Standard Stock. The last of the original trains ran in service until 1939. A number of motor cars were rebuilt as sleet locomotives.

== Original trains ==
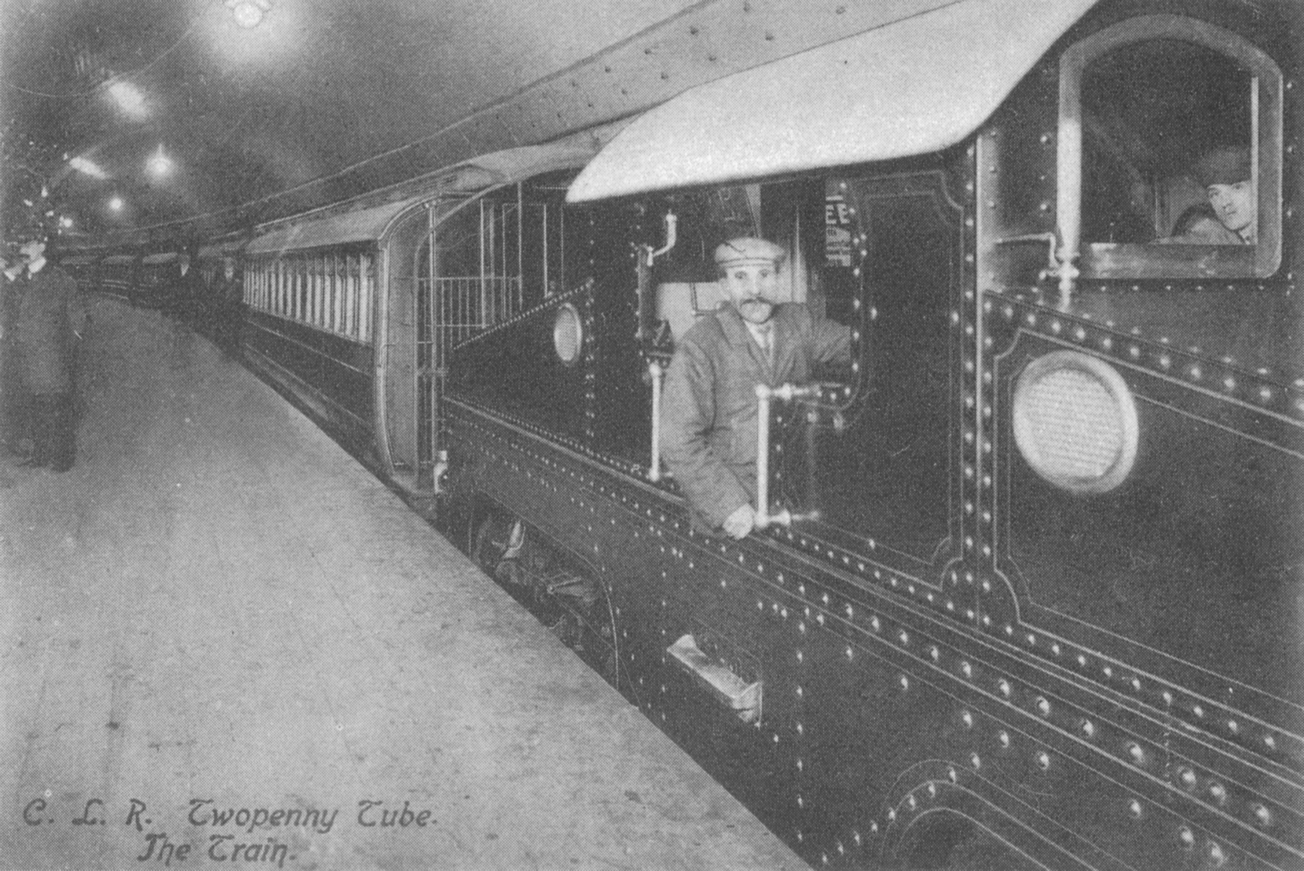
Locomotive and carriages at Shepherd's Bush tube station

Initially the Central London Railway (CLR) purchased 168 carriages (Note: Although Bruce (1988, p. 26) gives the total as 170, with 145 coming from Ashbury and 25 from Brush, Croome & Jackson (1993, p. 38) and Day & Reed (2010, p. 54) agree on 168.) from Ashbury Railway Carriage & Iron Co. and Brush. Made in 1900–1901 and weighing 14 tons, these seated 48 passengers, 32 on longitudinal seating with 16 on transverse seating in the centre. The cars were 9 feet 4 1/2 inches (2.858 m) high and 8 feet 6 inches (2.59 m) wide, to run in tubes with a diameter of 11 feet 6 inches (3.51 m). The wooden carriage bodies were 39 feet (12 m) long on 45 feet 6 inches (13.87 m) underframes, with 3 feet 3 inches (0.99 m) wide platforms at each end. Sliding doors at the ends of the carriage led to these platforms that had lattice gates either side. Gatesman rode on the platforms between the cars and operated the gates.

The Board of Trade refused to allow trains with an electric locomotive at the head and tail as this would require power lines the length of the train so thirty-two larger locomotives were ordered, although the CLR only received 28. These were camel-backed with four 117 horsepower (87 kW) motors mounted on two bogies. Manned in the centre cab by a driver and second man, who would uncouple and couple the locomotive at the end of each journey, the locomotives took power from a positive centre rail at 500–550 V DC. (Note: Croome & Jackson (1993, p. 38) and Day & Reed (2010, p. 57) note this was supplied from rotary converters at 550 V and Bruce (1988, p. 25) mentions there was 500 V at the rail.)

Soon after opening, the company received complaints that vibration was felt in the buildings above the route. The Board of Trade appointed an investigating committee in January 1901, which reported in May that the problem was due to the large unsprung mass of the 44-ton locomotives, and the track. An experiment in August showed the vibrations could be reduced by rebuilding locomotives to reduce the unsprung mass to 10 3/4 tons. The following month, after four of the carriages had been converted into motor cars and fitted with British Thomson-Houston control equipment that had been invented by Frank J. Sprague in Chicago, an electric multiple unit was tested.

== Electric multiple units ==
The report, published in February 1902, found that the multiple unit was superior. In May 1902 the CLR ordered 64 motor cars, 40 from Birmingham Railway Carriage and Wagon and 24 from Metropolitan Amalgamated Railway Carriage & Wagon. Seating 42 passengers, 24 in transverse bays and 18 on longitudinal seating, these were powered by two GE66 125 horsepower (93 kW) traction motors. Deliveries started in January 1903 and by June the railway had converted its fleet. The locomotives were offered for sale, and 24 sold for scrap in 1906. Two were kept by the CLR for shunting in the depot yard, the last withdrawn in 1942.

In 1904, six additional trailers from Birmingham arrived and sixty-six trailers were converted into control trailers. Normally trains were formed of six cars with motor cars at either end and control trailers in the centre, although sometimes seven-car trains were formed. Between 1912 and 1914 tripcocks and deadman handles were fitted to the motor cars and control trailers. Before then there were two men in the cab.

== Ealing Stock ==
The Great Western Railway had permission for a line from Ealing Broadway to a station near to CLR's Shepherd's Bush station, with a connection to the West London Railway. In 1911 there was agreement to connect the line to the Central London Railway and for the CLR to run trains to Ealing. Construction started in 1912. The CLR ordered 24 new all-steel motor cars from Brush for the Ealing services. These were 47 feet 9 inches (14.55 m) long and equipped with an incompatible traction control system, with automatic acceleration, controlling more powerful 240 horsepower (180 kW) GE212 motors. Seating 32 in a heated saloon accessed by centre and end swing doors, these were the first tube cars without end gates.

Work on the line was stopped by the outbreak of World War I in 1914. The 22 vehicles that had been received in 1915 were stored until 1917 when they were lent to the Bakerloo line. These ran on the extension to Watford Junction with Piccadilly line trailers until 1920–1921, when they returned to the Central London. Trailer cars were modified with new control cables compatible with the new motor cars and heaters, as the line to Ealing was not in tunnel, and two groups of stock formed, were known as Tunnel (or Local) Stock and Ealing Stock. As traffic to Ealing increased, in 1925–1926 eight of the original motor cars were modified to augment the Ealing Stock.

Services were mainly provided by six-car trains, although off-peak three-cars were provided west of Wood Lane. Seven-car trains using the 1903 motor cars were considered under-powered, but only a few peak-hour seven-car services were operated with Ealing Stock.

== Reconstruction ==
Stock with air-doors first entered service on the London Underground in 1921. From 1923 Standard Stock operated on the Hampstead line, allowing staff to be reduced to front and rear guards and a driver. A Central London car was experimentally rebuilt with air-doors in 1925. By 1928 all cars had been converted, the work being carried out at the Union Construction Company at Feltham. The end platforms were enclosed and trailer cars were equipped with two 3 feet 6 inches (1.07 m) openings with a single leaf sliding doors on each side. Motor cars had a single larger opening with a double-leaf sliding door and a guard's compartment with a hinged door.

The sliding doors were pneumatically operated, later assisted with electrically controlled exhaust valves to speed up opening. In 1926–1927, while the conversion was in progress, two six-car trains of 1906 Stock and 1920 Stock were borrowed from the Piccadilly line, the trailers fitted with smaller wheels to allow them to run in the smaller Central London tunnels. Fitting the air-doors reduced the number of seats, from 48 to 40 in the trailers and 42 to 30 in the motor cars.

== Replacement and withdrawal ==
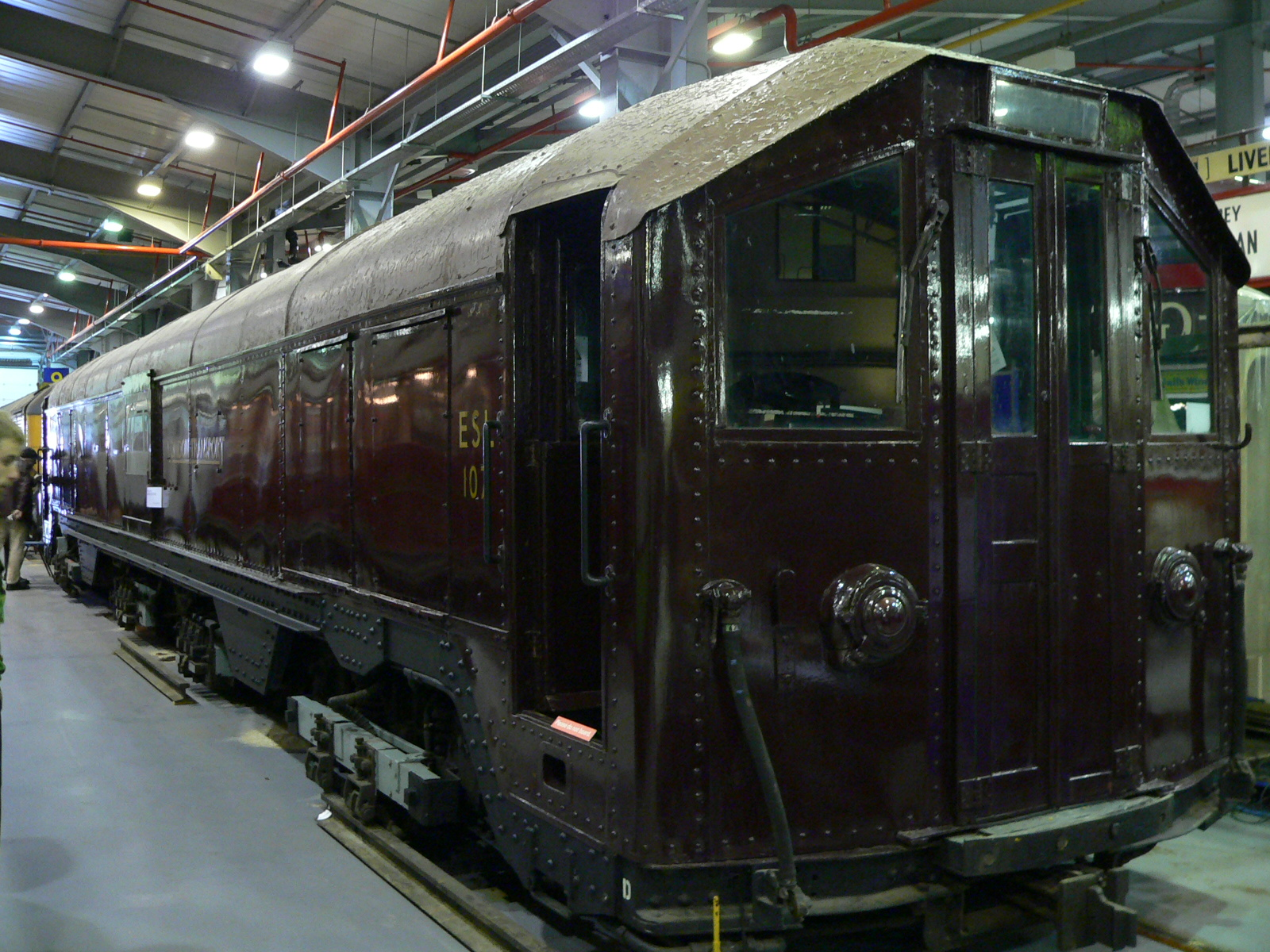
Motor cars were converted into sleet locomotives. One is preserved at the London Transport Museum

In 1933, the CLR passed with the rest of the Underground Electric Railways Company of London to the newly formed London Passenger Transport Board (LPTB). The 1935–1940 New Works Programme included the extension of the Central London (renamed the Central line in 1937) to West Ruislip in the west and to Epping and Ongar in the East. The stations and tunnels were enlarged to take eight-car trains of Standard Stock; the first six-car trains ran in 1938. The three-rail electrical system was converted to the system's standard four-rail system in 1940.

The Central London Stock was retired from service, with the last run in regular service being on 10 June 1939, followed by a farewell special on 12 July 1939. Afterwards, 36 of the cars were rebuilt into 18 sleet locomotives, numbered ESL100–ESL117, the driving ends of each car joined to make one double-ended vehicle. One of these trains can be found at the London Transport Museum Acton Depot.

== Notes and references ==
=== Books ===
- Bruce, J Graeme (1988). The London Underground Tube Stock. Shepperton: Ian Allan and London Transport Museum. ISBN 0-7110-1707-7.
- Croome, D.; Jackson, A (1993). Rails Through The Clay – A History of London's Tube Railways (2nd ed.). Capital Transport. ISBN 1-85414-151-1.
- Day, John R; Reed, John (2010) [1963]. The Story of London's Underground (11th ed.). Capital Transport. ISBN 978-1-85414-341-9.
