= London Underground T Stock =

British electric rolling stock

T Stock
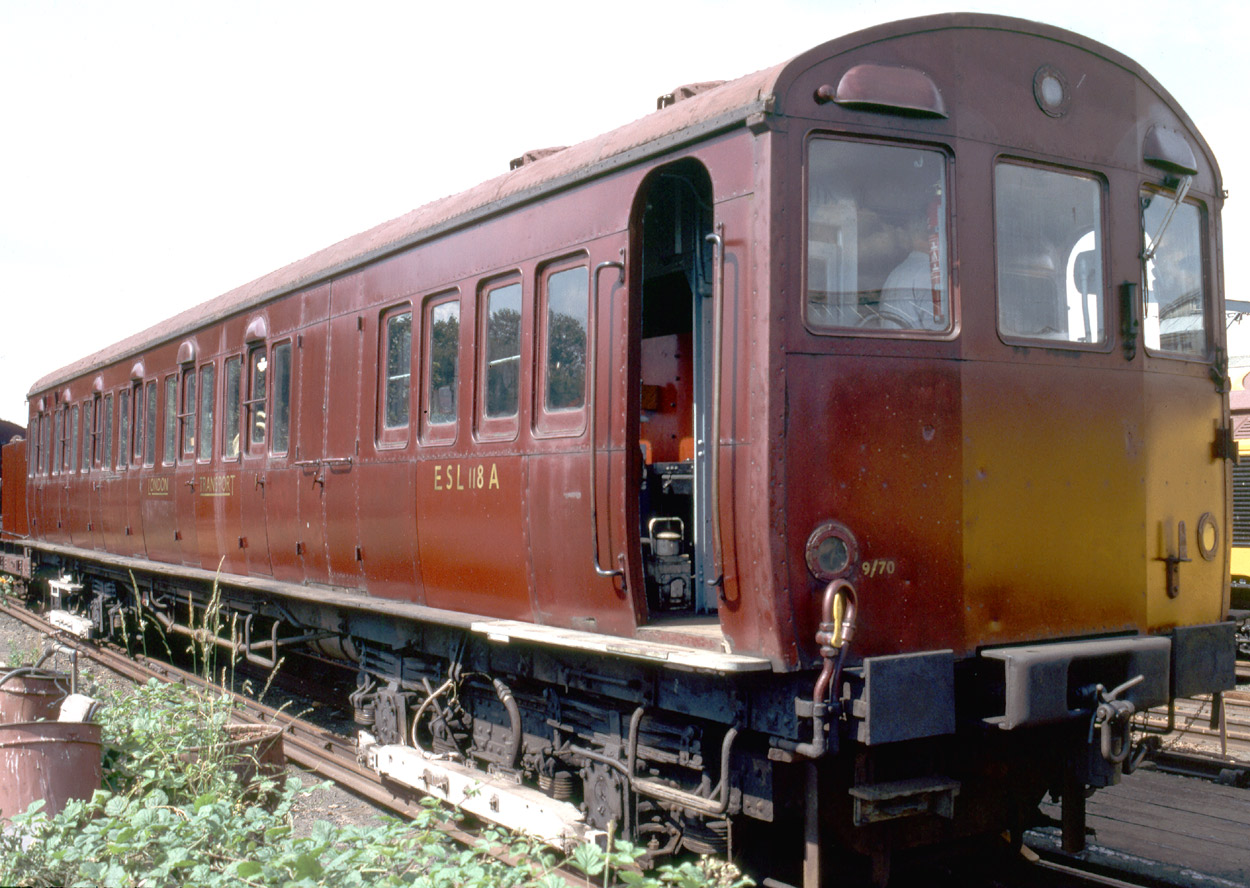
- T Stock unit at an Acton Works open day, 1983
- Stock type: Subsurface
- In service: 1927–1962
- Manufacturer: Birmingham RC&W

Specifications
- Car length: 53 ft 9 in (16.38 m) – 55 ft 5 in (16.89 m)

The T Stock was a series of electric trains originally built in various batches by Metropolitan-Vickers and the Birmingham Railway Carriage and Wagon Company for the Metropolitan Railway in 1927–31 for use on electric services from Baker Street and the City to Watford and Rickmansworth, though rarely some worked on the Uxbridge branch.

== History ==
The earlier batches were built from wood and sandwiched trailers of 1898–1923 vintage, however later batches were steel in construction and worked with newly built trailers. As built, the group has some variations in equipment, mostly to allow use with existing stock such as the Saloon and Ashbury trailers and leading to incompatibilities within the class, however upon transfer to London Transport this was rectified and the entire fleet largely standardized about 1938.

T stock never ran to Aylesbury, though they latterly worked to Chesham and Amersham after electrification. Prior to this, trains destined to beyond Rickmansworth were hauled by Metropolitan Vickers Bo-Bo electric locomotives as far as Rickmansworth, where a changeover to steam traction occurred.

These electric multiple unit trains had slam doors with rounded tops, thought to be less prone to damage if accidentally opened in the tunnels north of Baker Street.

In the late 1940s coaches 2752 and 2707 were rebuilt as experimental air-door trailers number 17000 and 20000 respectively. The first (17000) employed an unusual seating layout with gangways on both sides of the car. The air doors were controlled manually by passengers with buttons to open and close them. In 1949 it was modified with a conventional centre gangway to match its second variant, and being renumbered 17001. The two cars were permanently coupled and remained in service until 1953, their work as prototypes for the A60 Stock being completed.

The 'T' stock was replaced from 1961 by the A60 and A62 Stock, with the final train running on 5 October 1962.

In 1961, two withdrawn driving motors were converted to sleet locomotives. These were numbered ESL118A and ESL118B, having previously been 2758 and 2749 respectively. After withdrawal, both units were preserved, eventually being located at the Spa Valley Railway but now moved to Quainton Road.

== Equipment details ==
The first coaches of the first batch (1927) had Westinghouse brakes, Metropolitan-Vickers control systems and MV153 motors; they were used to replace the motor cars working with Bogie Stock trailers that formed 'W' trains.

The rest of the coaches from the first batch had the same motor equipment but used vacuum brakes instead. They ran with converted Dreadnoughts of the 1920/23 batches to form 'MV' stock.

The second batch (of 1929) were very similar in terms of equipment to the first coaches of 1927 and were interchangeable. This batch included specially built trailers and when running with which were known as 'MW' trains; the W indicating Westinghouse Air Brakes were fitted.

The last batch (1931) were like the previous batch but had equipment by the GEC and used WT545 motors. They were found not to be as compatible as hoped, and remained segregated until the London Passenger Transport Board (LPTB) standardisation of Metropolitan Railway rolling stock.

When standardised, the MV stock trains were converted to air brakes. The Bogie Stock coaches in the W stock formations were withdrawn eventually and replaced by seven more converted Dreadnought coaches. Following a reshuffle this allowed 9×8 coach and 10×6 coach trains, which were then designated 'T' stock. 22 motor cars remained spare however, but by 1961 this had been reduced to six spare.

=== Fleet details ===
Abbreviations
BRC&W	Birmingham Railway Carriage and Wagon Company
MCW&F	Metropolitan Carriage, Wagon and Finance Company
M	Motor car
1T	First class trailer
3T	Third class trailer
DT	Driving trailer

Nos	LT Nos	Year	Bldr	Type	Notes
200–205	2700–2705	1927	MCW&F	M	"W"
206–211	2706–2711	1927	MCW&F	M	"MV"
212–241	2712–2741	1930	BRC&W	M	"W","VT"
242–259	2742–2759	1932	BRC&W	M	"MW"
449,455	9812,9818	1920	MCW&F	1T	converted by LT
457–458	9820–9821	1920	MCW&F	1T	converted by LT
460–462	9716–9718	1920	MCW&F	1T	"MV"; converted from steam stock, 1927
476	9773	1920	MCW&F	3T	"MV"; converted from steam stock, 1927
477–482	6706–6711	1920	MCW&F	DT	"MV"
484,487	6743,6746	1920	MCW&F	DT	converted by LT
497–499	9800–9802	1920	MCW&F	3T	converted by LT
500–501	9774–9775	1920	MCW&F	3T	"MV"; converted from steam stock, 1927
504	9842	1923	MCW&F	3T	converted by LT
505–507	9719–9721	1923	MCW&F	1T	"MV"; converted from steam stock, 1927
511–520	9722–9731	1930	BRC&W	1T	"MW"
521–525	9776–9780	1930	BRC&W	3T	"MW"
526–535	6712–6721	1930	BRC&W	DT	"MW"
536–549	6722–6735	1932	BRC&W	DT	"MW"
550–568	9781–9799	1932	BRC&W	3T	"MW"
569–582	9732–9745	1932	BRC&W	1T	"MW"
