= West 12 =

W12
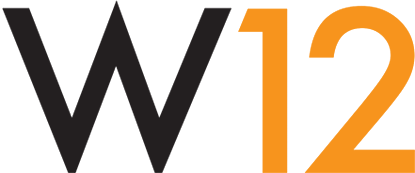

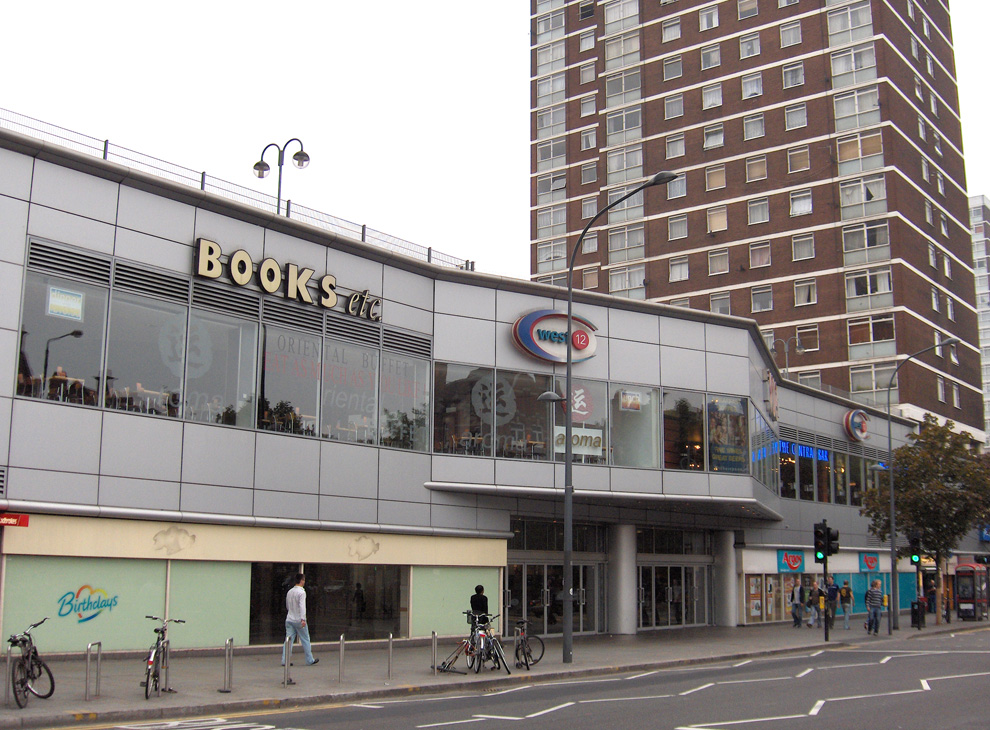
- West12 shopping centre in 2006
- Location: Shepherd's Bush, London, England
- Coordinates: 51.503739°N 0.218772°W
- Opened: 1967; 59 years ago
- Developer: Parway Land Investments Ltd
- Website: west12shopping.co.uk

W12 (West 12 Shepherd's Bush, formerly the Concorde Centre) is a shopping centre in Shepherd's Bush in the London Borough of Hammersmith and Fulham. The modern development borders the south side of Shepherd's Bush Green and was designed in the 1960s.

== History ==
The shopping centre first opened in 1967, as a joint venture between Parway Land Investments Ltd, the London Borough of Hammersmith and Fulham, the Greater London Council and the Campden Charities, the latter owners of the Charcroft Estate. The architects were Sydney Kaye, Eric Firmin & Partners. It is located on the south side of Shepherd's Bush Green, next to a number of large public housing blocks including Woodford Court and Roseford Court.

Originally constructed with a rooftop car park and a connecting bridge to the station (decorated with an Inter-City railway train mural), West 12 was significantly redeveloped in the 1990s. The bridge was removed, and the centre now houses several chain stores, a 12-screen Vue cinema, gym, pub, restaurants, a Bush Doctors and a Lidl supermarket (formerly a Presto, then Safeway followed by Morrisons).

The centre borders on, but is not a part of, the Shepherd's Bush Conservation Area.

In March 2012 it was announced that a new Ibis Hotel would be constructed as a part of the shopping centre, replacing offices and shop units which had been empty for about 3 years. The hotel opened in the summer of 2012

In August 2017 it was announced that Lidl would replace Morrisons which shut in late 2016. The shop opened in March 2018.

== Tenants ==
As of November 2023, tenants of West 12 include Sainsbury’s, Boots, Card Factory, CeX, Holland & Barrett, JD Sports, Lidl and Vue Cinemas.

== See also ==
- History of Shepherd's Bush
- List of shopping centres in the United Kingdom
- Westfield London
