= Goldhawk Road =

Road in west London

Coordinates: 51.502°N 0.227°W

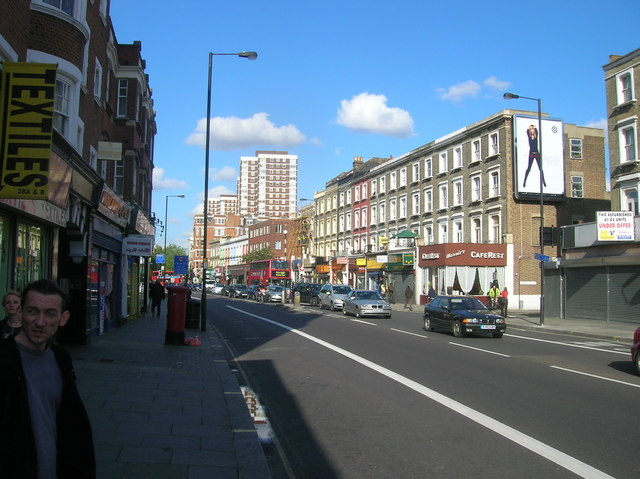
Goldhawk Road, W12, looking towards Shepherd's Bush

Goldhawk Road is a road in West London, England, which starts at Shepherd's Bush and travels west. There are numerous shops, restaurants and businesses lining the road, which forms the southern boundary of Shepherd's Bush Green. It is designated part of the A402 road.

== History ==
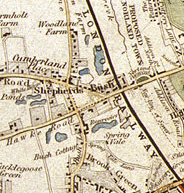
Shepherd's Bush, from an 1841 London map by Davies.

Goldhawk Road's name derives from one John Goldhawk, who in the late 14th century held extensive estates in Fulham.

Goldhawk Road was of little note until the mid-seventeenth century, when a cottage on the street became the home of Miles Sindercombe, a Roundhead who in 1657 made several attempts to assassinate Oliver Cromwell. Sindercombe planned to ambush the Lord Protector using a specially built machine with muskets fixed to a frame. His plan failed and Sindercombe was sentenced to death. His cottage was demolished in the 1760s.

A map of London dated 1841 shows Goldhawk Road forming the southern boundary of Shepherd's Bush Green. At that time Shepherd's Bush was still largely undeveloped and chiefly rural in character, with much open farmland compared to fast-developing Hammersmith, and several ponds or small lakes. Scattered buildings are shown, mostly lining the main thoroughfares of Wood Lane, Cumberland Road (now the Uxbridge Road) and Goldhawk Road.

From 1939 until 1999 Queen Charlotte's Hospital was situated in Goldhawk Road.

== Railways ==
=== Goldhawk Road station ===
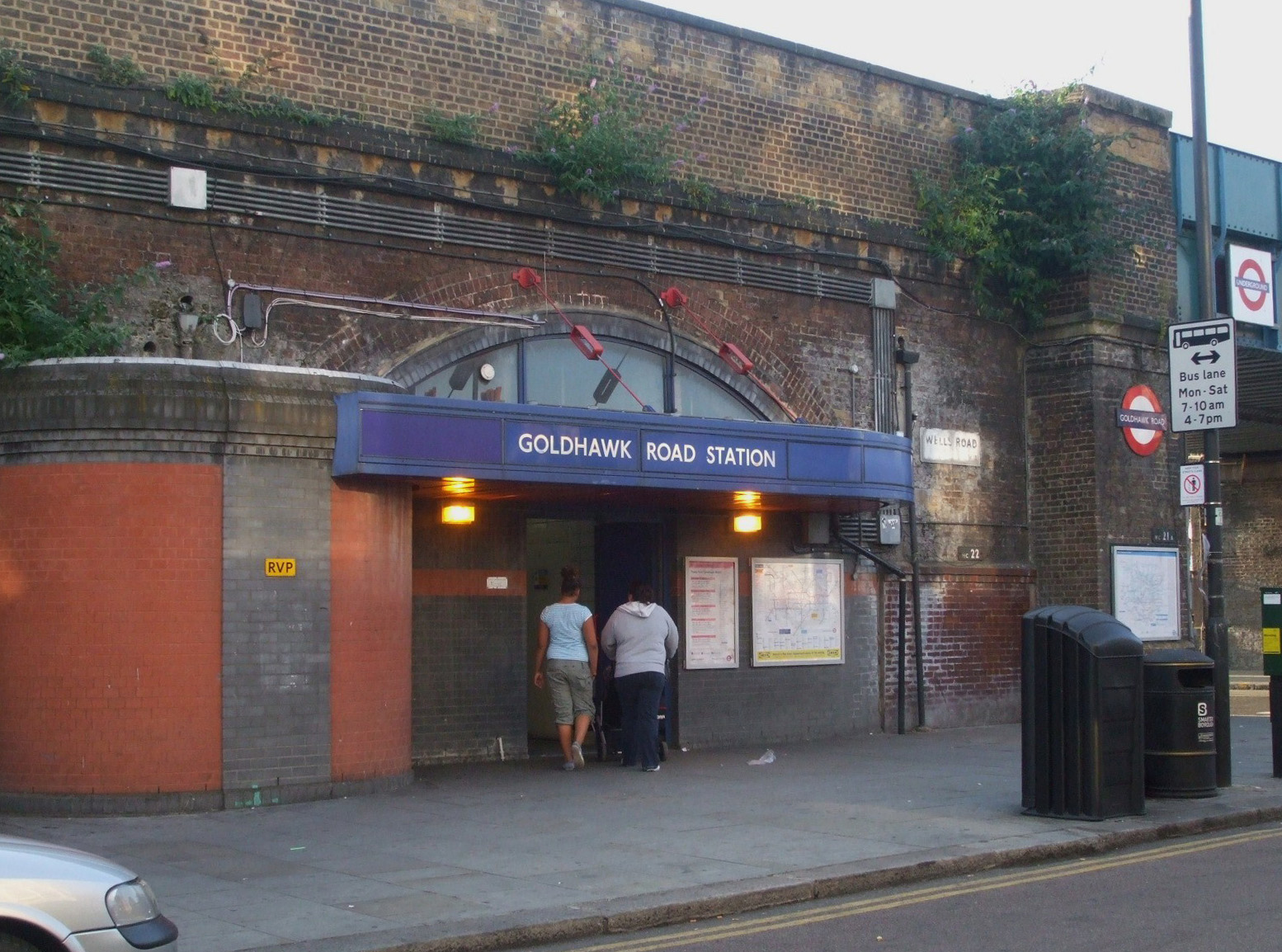
Goldhawk Road tube station

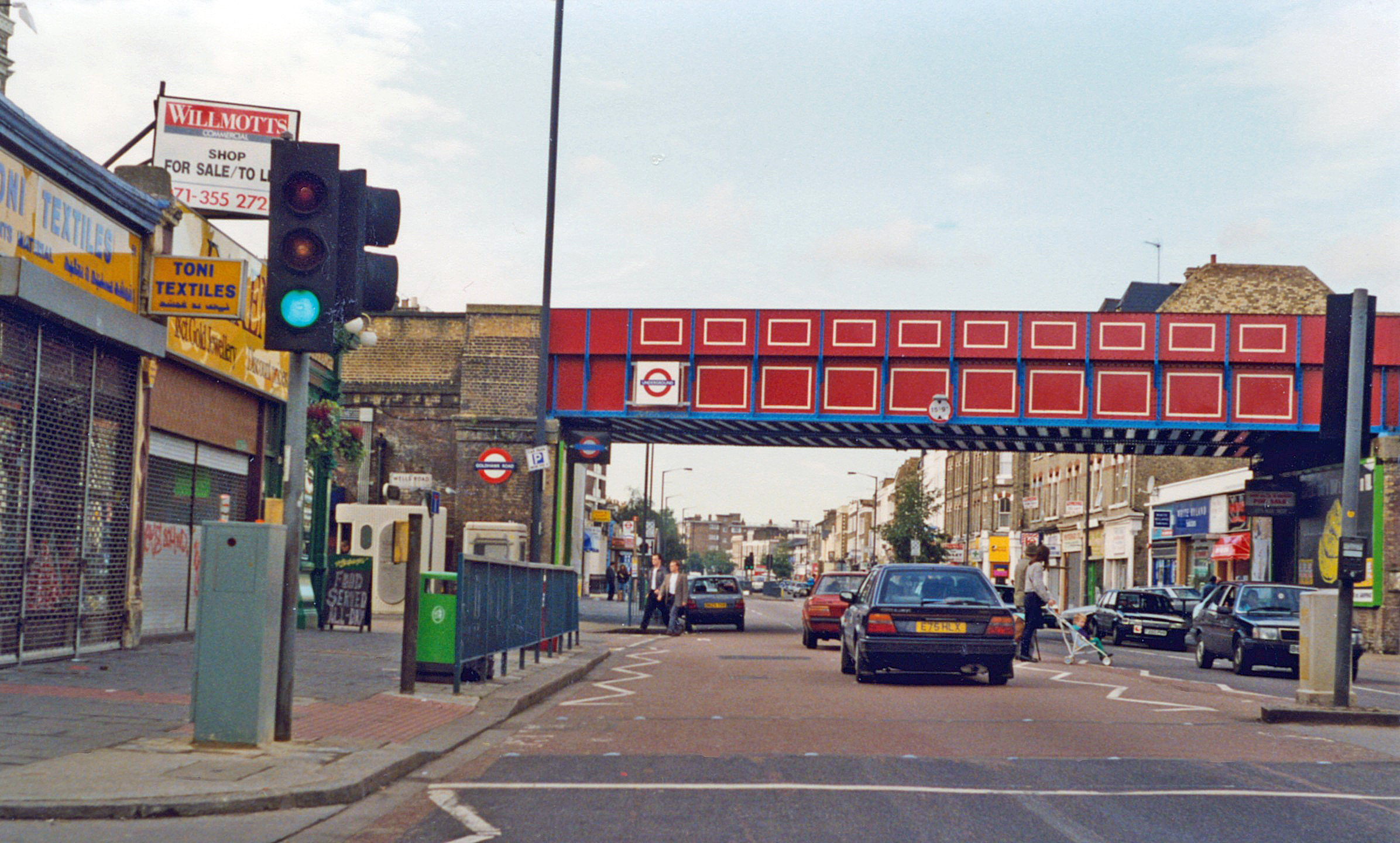
Railway bridge and entrance to Goldhawk Road station in October 1993

Goldhawk Road tube station is a London Underground station located in the London Borough of Hammersmith and Fulham, on the south side of Goldhawk Road, about 250m west of Shepherd's Bush Green. It is on the Hammersmith & City and Circle lines in London fare zone 2. It is also the least used station for both lines.

==== Original 1914 station ====
Although the line here was opened in 1864, a station was not opened at this location until 1 April 1914, when Shepherd's Bush station (now Shepherd's Bush Market) was moved from its original location between Uxbridge Road and Goldhawk Road, to a location on the north side of Uxbridge Road.

=== Stamford Brook station ===
Stamford Brook Underground station, though located in the London Borough of Hounslow, also has its main entrance in Goldhawk Road, near the Chiswick end.

== See also ==
- Goldhawk Road tube station
- History of Shepherd's Bush
- Shepherd's Bush
- Shepherd's Bush Market
