= Bush Court =

Building in Shepherd's Bush, London, England

Coordinates: 51.503910°N 0.218443°W

Bush Court is a large tower block built as part of a public housing project in the 1970s in Shepherd's Bush, London. It is located on the south side of Shepherd's Bush Green and falls just outside the Shepherd's Bush Conservation Area. Although built as public housing, a number of the flats are now privately owned and are regularly offered for sale to the public.

== History ==
Like its sister towers, Woodford Court and Roseford Court, Bush Court was designed and built of steel and concrete in a modern style by the then Labour-controlled Council. Bush Court was completed in 1974. It is 184 feet high and contains 112 housing units on 19 floors.

== See also ==
- History of Shepherd's Bush
- Roseford Court
- Woodford Court
