= Goldhawk Road tube station =

London Underground station

Goldhawk Road
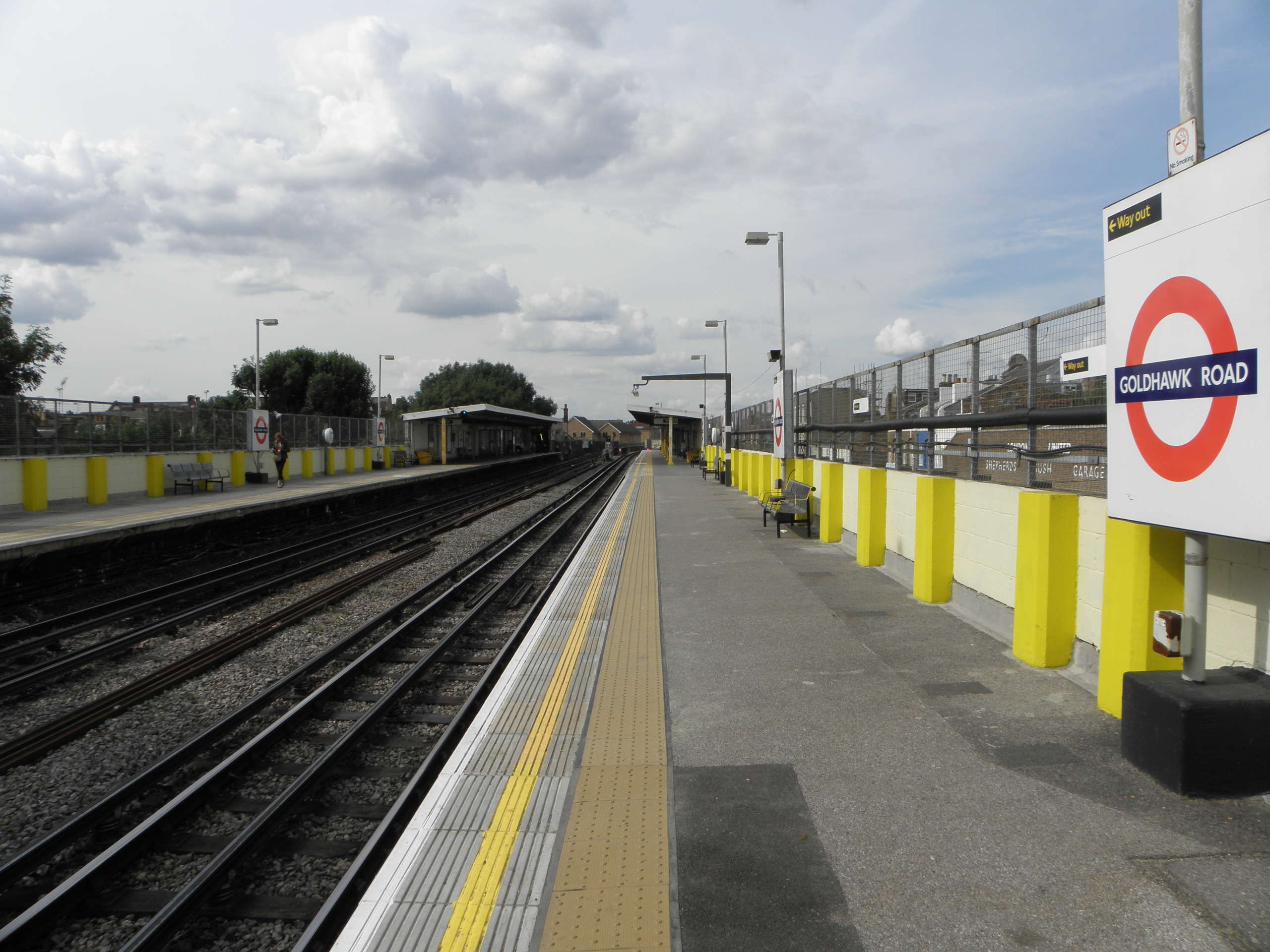
- The eastbound platform in 2012, looking north towards Shepherd's Bush Market
- Interactive map of Goldhawk Road

General information
- Location: Goldhawk Road, Shepherd's Bush
- Local authority: Hammersmith and Fulham
- Managed by: London Underground
- Number of platforms: 2
- Fare zone: 2

London Underground annual entry and exit
- 2021: ▼0.95 million
- 2022: ▲1.68 million
- 2023: ▲1.80 million
- 2024: ▲1.82 million
- 2025: ▲1.85 million

Railway companies
- Original company: Hammersmith and City Railway
- Pre-grouping: Hammersmith and City Railway
- Post-grouping: Hammersmith and City Railway

Key dates
- 13 June 1864: Line opened
- 1 April 1914: Station opened

Other information
- External links: TfL station info page
- Coordinates: 51.502°N 0.227°W

Goldhawk Road is a London Underground station located in the London Borough of Hammersmith and Fulham, on the corner of Goldhawk Road and Wells Road, about 250 metres (820 ft) west of Shepherd's Bush Green. It is on the Circle and Hammersmith & City lines, between Hammersmith and Shepherd's Bush Market stations. It is in London fare zone 2.

Although this section of (what was then) the Metropolitan line opened on 13 June 1864, a station was not built here until 1 April 1914 when Shepherd's Bush station (now Shepherd's Bush Market) was moved from its original location between Uxbridge Road and Goldhawk Road to a new site on the north side of Uxbridge Road.

== Station amenities ==
The station currently benefits from a ticket office and two Passenger Operated Machines (or POMs). The larger POM, called a Multi Fare Machine (MFM), accepts UK Sterling notes up to the value of £20, and gives change consisting of 10p, 50p, £1, and £2 coins. The smaller machine, known as an Advance Fare Machine (AFM), does not give change, and accepts overpayment up to 30p. Both machines accept most major credit and debit cards; however, to help combat fraud, individual cards can only be used once a day. These machines are the standard London Underground installation at all LU operated stations.

Map of stations in Shepherd's Bush area showing Latimer Road and the closed connection to Uxbridge Road station

The station also benefits from the use of Electric Service Update Boards (or ESUBs). These large screens display service information which is updated from the Network Operations Centre, located in London Underground's head office above St James's Park Tube station.

== Connections ==
London Buses routes 94 and 237 serve the station.

== Local amenities ==
There is one business operating on the station premises as of 9 October 2014: a speciality coffee house.

Directly across Goldhawk Road is the southern entrance to Shepherd's Bush Market. A traditional pie and mash shop operates on the north side of Goldhawk Road – almost directly opposite the Wells Street entrance to the station – as do various other eating and drinking establishments.

Both the Loftus Road Stadium and the historic music venue currently known as the O2 Shepherd's Bush Empire – designed by theatre architect Frank Matcham, and originally opened in 1903 for impresario Oswald Stoll – are a short walk from the station.

Preceding station	London Underground	Following station
Hammersmith Terminus	Circle line	Shepherd's Bush Market towards Edgware Road via Aldgate
Hammersmith Terminus	Hammersmith & City line	Shepherd's Bush Market towards Barking
Former Service
Preceding station	London Underground	Following station
Hammersmith Terminus	Metropolitan line Hammersmith branch (1914–1990)	Shepherd's Bush towards Paddington
