= Woodford Court =

Building in Shepherd's Bush, London, England

Coordinates: 51°30′13″N 0°13′15″W

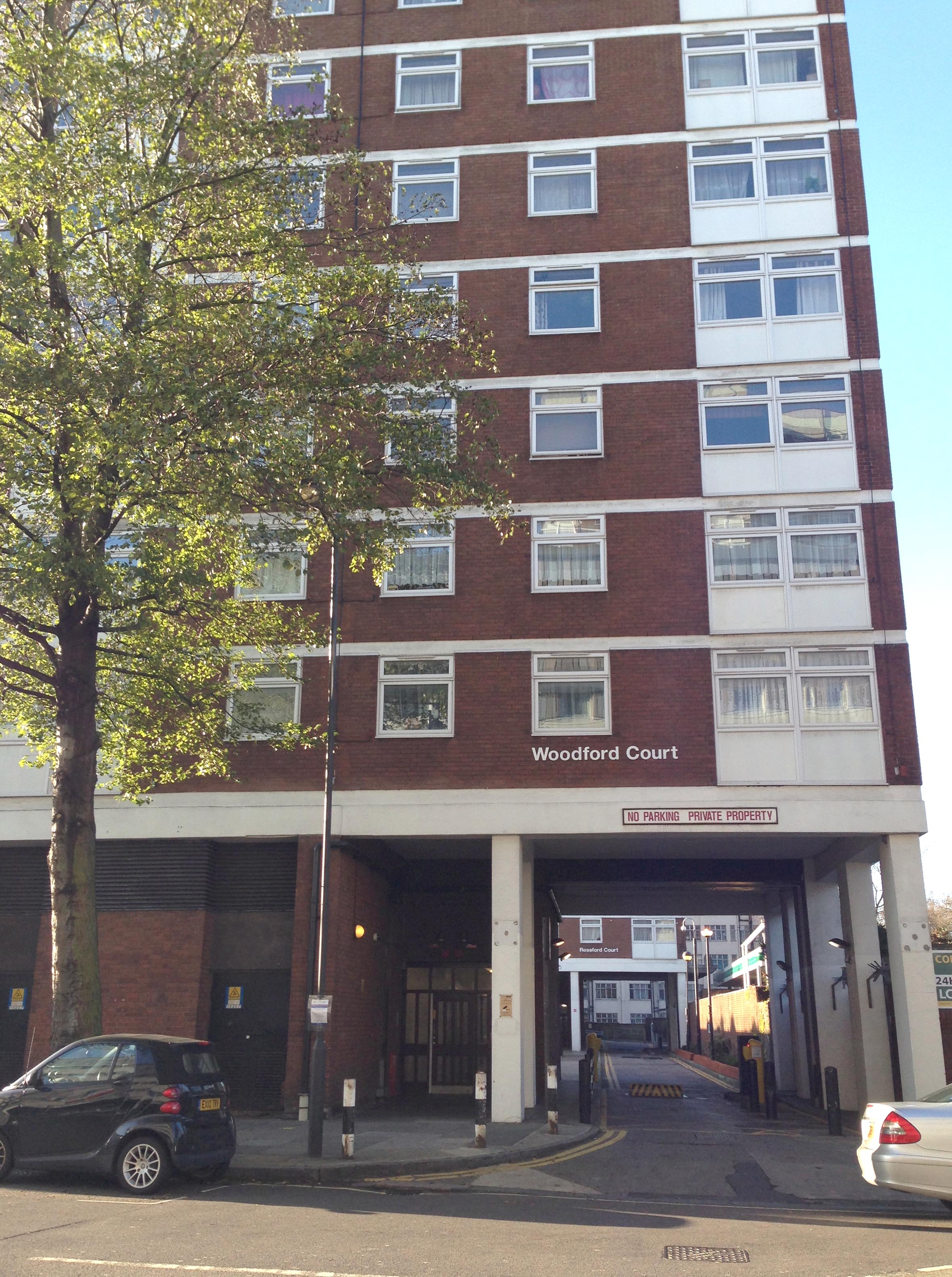
Woodford Court, Shepherd's Bush

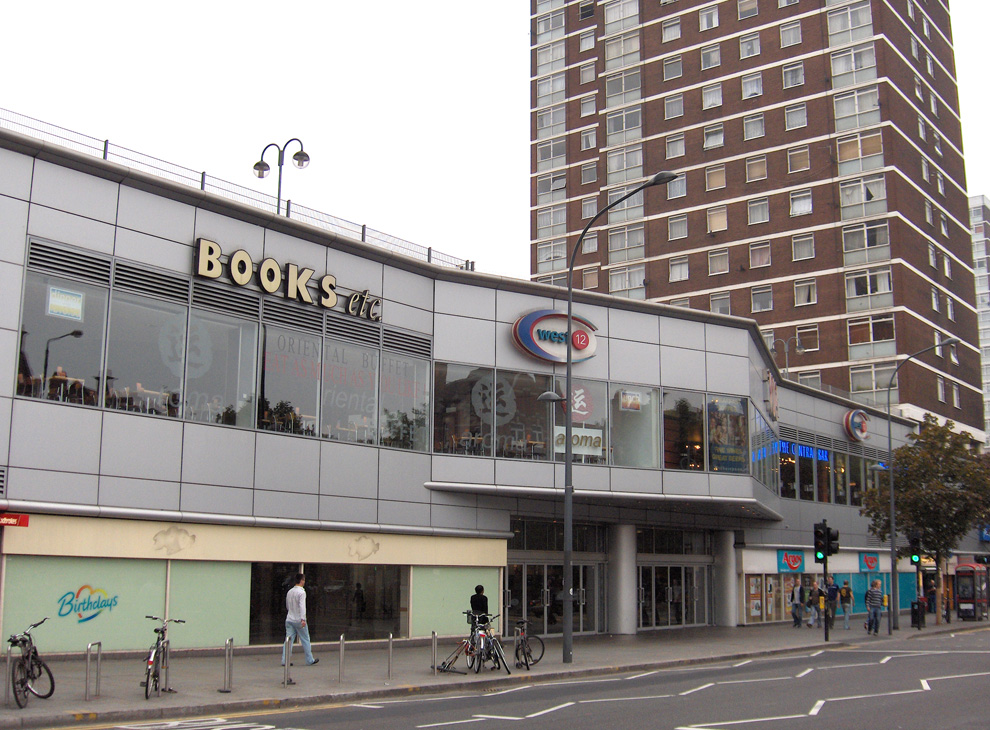
West12 Shopping Centre with Woodford Court in the background

Woodford Court is a large public housing project completed in 1974 in Shepherd's Bush, London. It is located on the south side of Shepherd's Bush Green and falls just outside the Shepherd's Bush Conservation Area.

== History ==
Like its sister towers Roseford Court, Bush Court and Shepherd's Court, Woodford Court was designed and built of steel and concrete in an unapologetically modern style, and was completed by the then Labour-controlled Council in 1974. It is 56 metres high and has 20 floors.

Woodford Court was the source of controversy in 2008 when a London Borough of Hammersmith and Fulham councillor, Lucy Ivimy, apologised for apparently accusing Indian people of throwing rubbish from windows.

Although built as public housing, a number of the flats are now privately owned and are regularly offered for sale to the public.

== Notable residents ==
Woodford Court was the home of one Anthony Charles, a suspect in a failed attempt to steal £90 million in gold bullion and cash from a Swissport cargo warehouse at Heathrow Airport, London, in 2004. Charles was the driver of a stolen Mercedes-Benz vehicle used in the attempted robbery. All of the men involved were convicted of various offences on Friday 16 September 2005 and imprisoned. Charles entered an early plea of guilty to conspiracy to rob, and was jailed for six years and nine months.

== See also ==
- Bush Court
- History of Shepherd's Bush
- Roseford Court
