= Roseford Court =

Building in Shepherd's Bush, London, England

Coordinates: 51.503327°N 0.221492°W

Roseford Court is a large tower block built as part of a public housing project in the 1970s in Shepherd's Bush, London. It is located on the south side of Shepherd's Bush Green and falls just outside the Shepherd's Bush Conservation Area. Although built as public housing, a number of the flats are now privately owned and are regularly offered for sale to the public.

== History ==
Like its sister towers, Woodford Court, Bush Court and Shepherd's Court, Roseford Court was designed and built of steel and concrete in an unapologetically modern style by the then Labour-controlled Council. Roseford Court was completed in 1974. It is 184 feet high and contains 113 housing units on 20 floors.

== Notable residents ==
Roseford Court was the home of one Fatimah Dodson, a benefit fraudster who dishonestly claimed more than £6,000 in Housing benefit and Council Tax benefit to which she was not entitled. She pleaded guilty to charges of fraud at West London Magistrates Court on 18 December 2008.

== See also ==
- History of Shepherd's Bush
- Woodford Court
- Bush Court
