= Hammersmith tube station (Circle and Hammersmith & City lines) =

London Underground station

Hammersmith
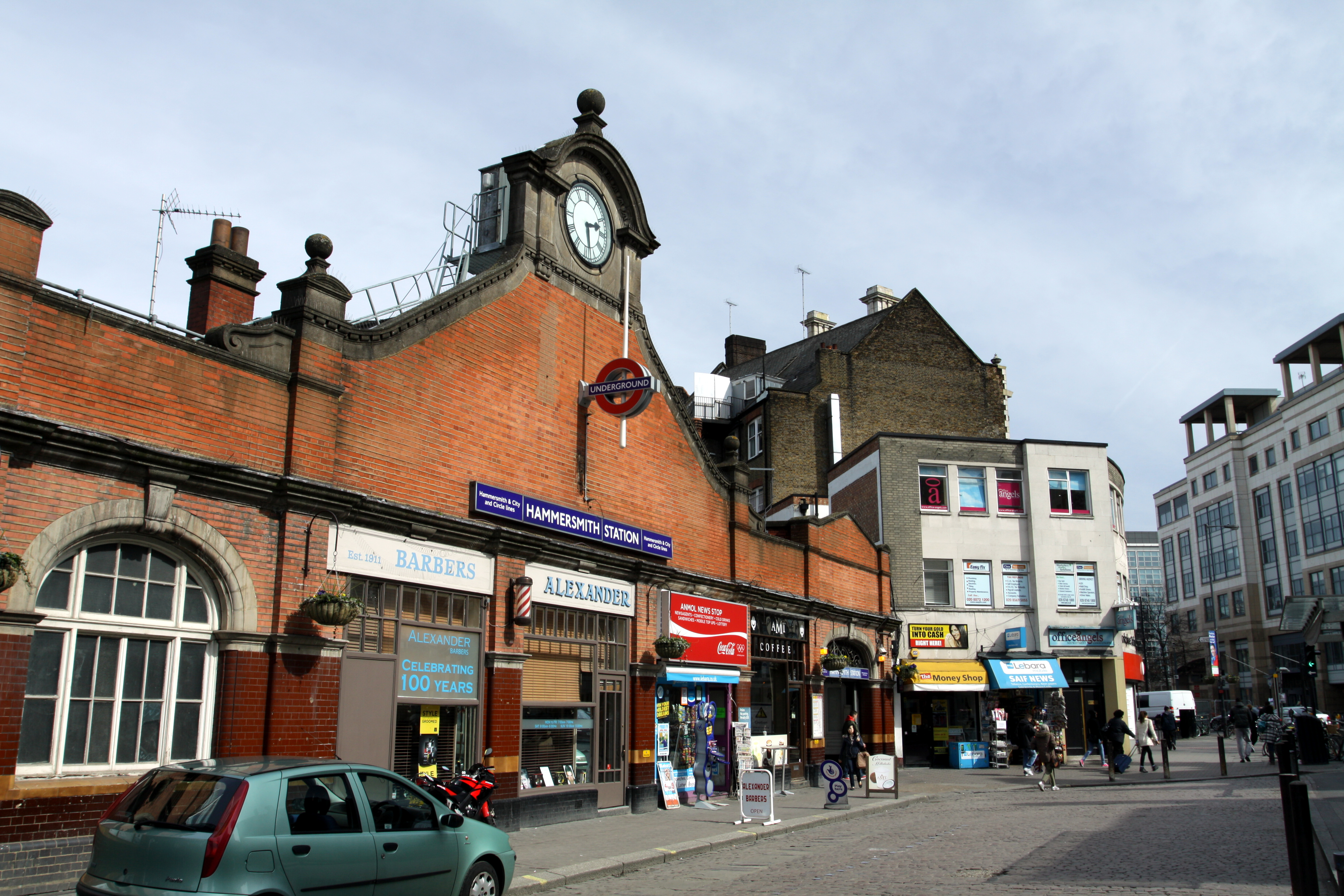
- Station entrance building
- Interactive map of Hammersmith

General information
- Location: Hammersmith
- Local authority: London Borough of Hammersmith and Fulham
- Managed by: London Underground
- Number of platforms: 3
- Accessible: Yes
- Fare zone: 2
- OSI: Hammersmith (District and Piccadilly lines)

London Underground annual entry and exit
- 2020: ▼3.93 million
- 2021: ▲4.23 million
- 2022: ▲8.04 million
- 2023: ▲8.71 million
- 2024: ▲9.92 million

Key dates
- 1864: Opened
- 1868: Resited
- 1 February 1960: Goods yard closed

Other information
- Coordinates: 51.494277°N 0.225037°W

Hammersmith is a London Underground station in Hammersmith, London. It is the western terminus of the Circle and Hammersmith & City lines, and the next station towards east is Goldhawk Road. It is in London fare zone 2.

The station is a short walk from the station of the same name on the District and Piccadilly lines. The two stations are separated by Hammersmith Broadway. They are about 60 m apart (200 ft) door to door, although the positions of the pedestrian crossings on the Broadway makes it farther on foot.

The Circle line has served Hammersmith since 13 December 2009. By June 2011 all of the platforms had been lengthened to accommodate the new and longer S7 Stock trains, that first entered service on the Hammersmith and City Line from the beginning of July 2012. These new trains are seven cars in length instead of the six cars of C Stock that previously operated.

== History ==
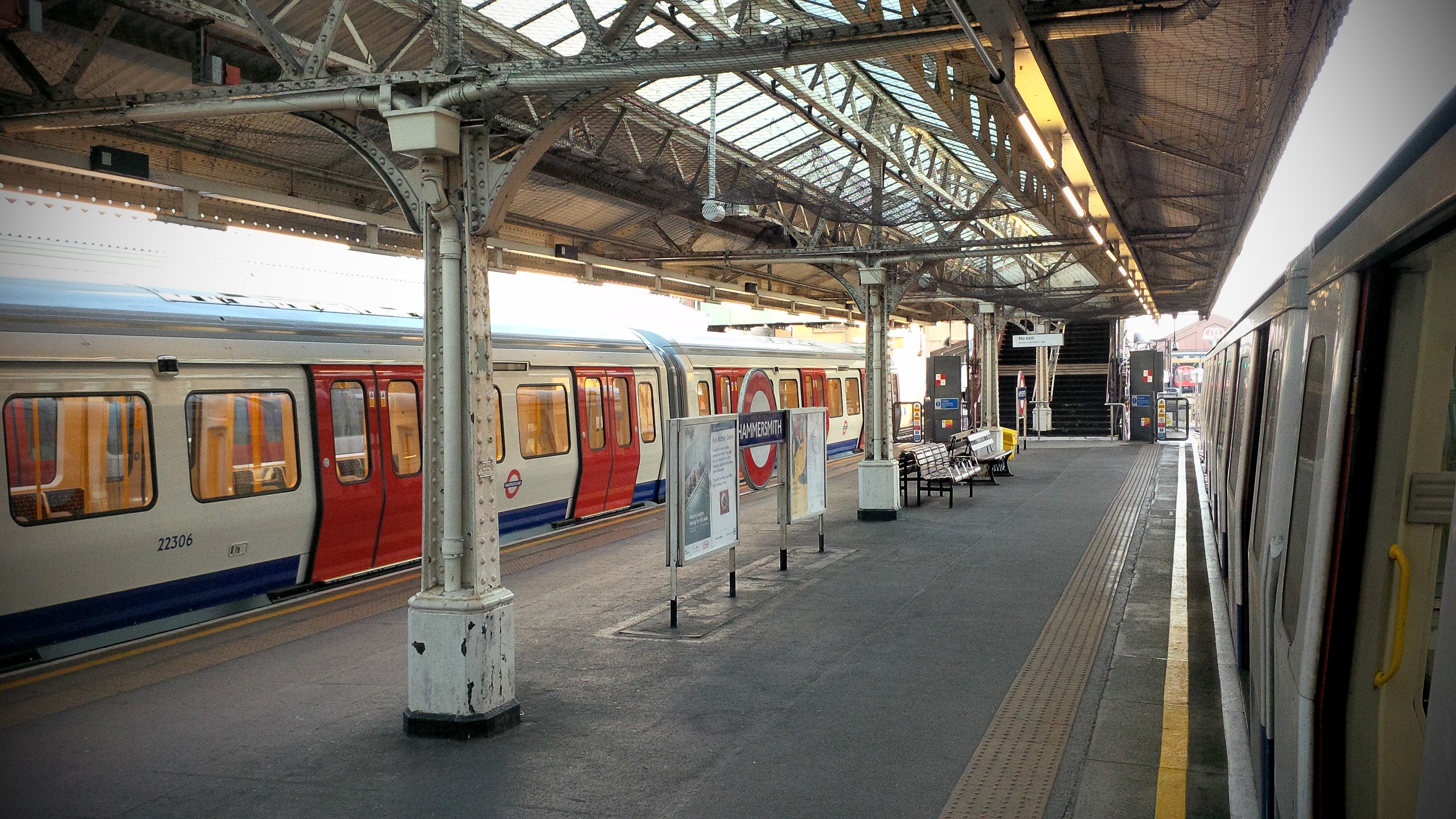
Platform view

The present station is situated on Beadon Road and opened on 1 December 1868, replacing the original station slightly north of here which opened on 13 June 1864 when the Metropolitan Railway's extension was built from Paddington.

The Metropolitan Railway operated a service from Hammersmith to Richmond from 1877 over the lines of the London and South Western Railway (lines that are now part of the modern District line) from a junction just north of this station via an adjacent station at Hammersmith (Grove Road) and a viaduct connection to Ravenscourt Park. Part of this viaduct is still visible from District and Piccadilly line trains west of the Hammersmith station on those lines. The extension closed on 31 December 1906 shortly after the introduction of electric trains on the line.

== Connections ==
London Buses day and night routes serve the station and the nearby Hammersmith bus station.

== See also ==
- Hammersmith tube station (District and Piccadilly lines), a different station of the same name as this station but is on the District and Piccadilly lines.
- Hammersmith Grove Road, a third station that used to exist adjacent to the Hammersmith and City Line station on the L&SWR line through Shepherd's Bush to the West London Line.

Preceding station	London Underground	Following station
Terminus	Circle line	Goldhawk Road towards Edgware Road via Aldgate
Terminus	Hammersmith & City line	Goldhawk Road towards Barking
Former services
Preceding station	London Underground	Following station
Terminus	Metropolitan line Hammersmith branch (1864–1914)	Shepherd's Bush towards Paddington
Terminus	Metropolitan line Hammersmith branch (1914–1990)	Goldhawk Road towards Paddington
