= Shepherd's Bush Market tube station =

London Underground station

Shepherd's Bush Market
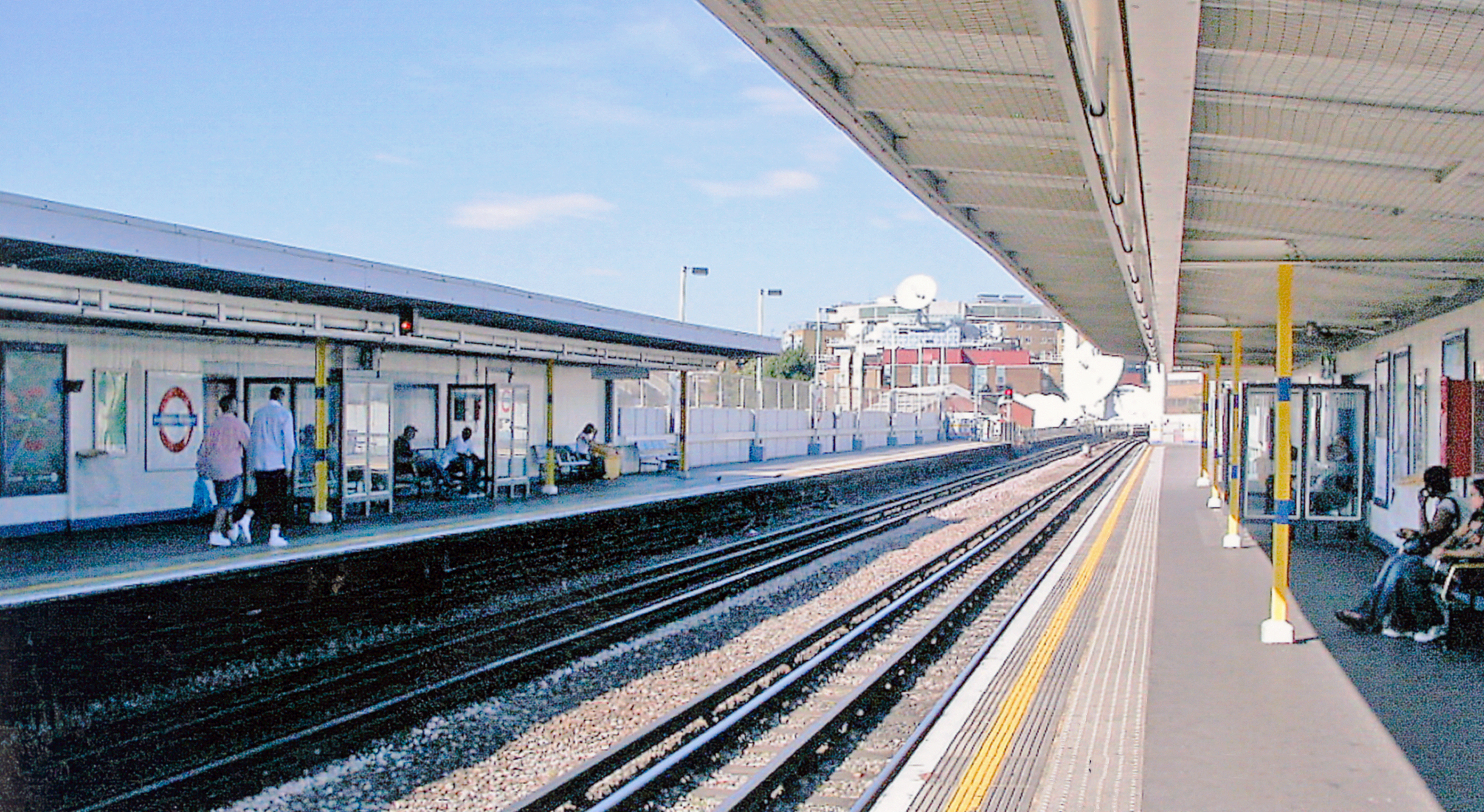
- The westbound platform in 2009, looking north towards BBC Television Centre
- Interactive map of Shepherd's Bush Market

General information
- Location: Shepherd's Bush
- Local authority: London Borough of Hammersmith and Fulham
- Managed by: London Underground
- Number of platforms: 2
- Fare zone: 2

London Underground annual entry and exit
- 2021: ▲1.66 million
- 2022: ▲2.89 million
- 2023: ▲3.22 million
- 2024: ▲3.26 million
- 2025: ▲3.39 million

Railway companies
- Original company: Hammersmith and City Railway
- Pre-grouping: Hammersmith and City Railway
- Post-grouping: Hammersmith and City Railway

Key dates
- 13 June 1864: Station opened as Shepherds Bush
- 1 April 1914: Relocated and renamed Shepherd's Bush
- 12 October 2008: Renamed Shepherd's Bush Market

Other information
- External links: TfL station info page
- Coordinates: 51.50583°N 0.22639°W

Shepherd's Bush Market is a London Underground station served by the Circle and Hammersmith & City lines in Shepherd's Bush, West London. It is situated between Goldhawk Road and Wood Lane stations, and is in London fare zone 2. Shepherd's Bush Market (the station's namesake) is an open-air market which runs parallel to the railway line.

== History ==
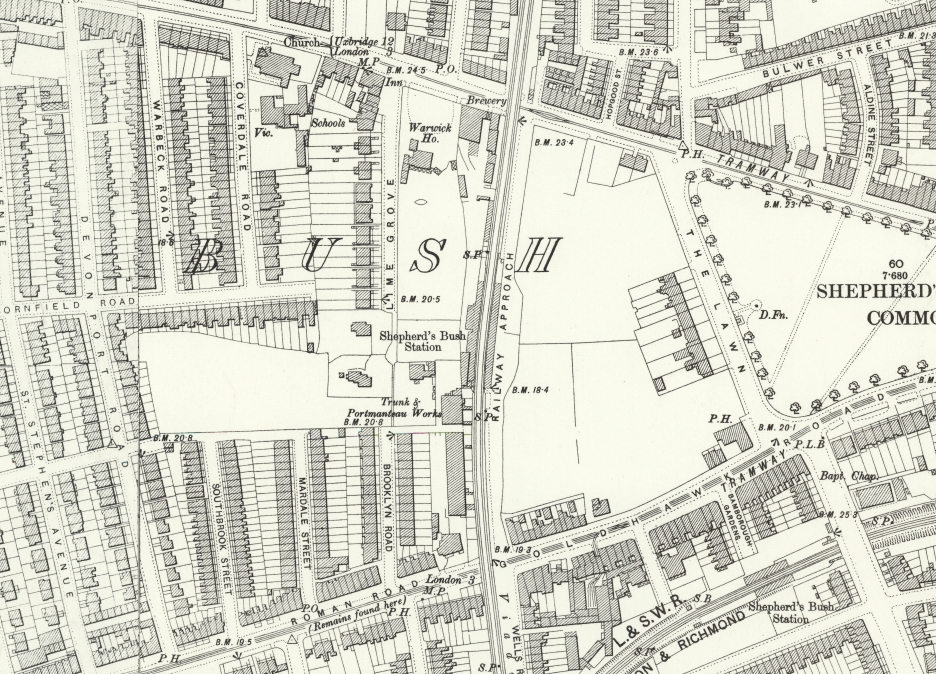
The original Shepherd's Bush station on a map from 1894

Stations around Shepherd's Bush

The Metropolitan Railway (MR) opened the original station on 13 June 1864 as Shepherd's Bush on its new extension to Hammersmith. It was in the Shepherd's Bush Market area just south of Uxbridge Road. From 1 October 1877 until 31 December 1906 the MR also ran direct services along this line to Richmond via Hammersmith (Grove Road).

The original Shepherd's Bush station closed in 1914 to be replaced by two new stations which opened on 1 April 1914: the new Shepherd's Bush station was re-sited a short distance north across the Uxbridge Road, whilst Goldhawk Road station was opened about half a kilometre to the south. These stations remain at the above-mentioned locations, but nothing remains of the former Shepherd's Bush station buildings.

In 1900 the Central London Railway (CLR) opened its Shepherd's Bush station(now the Central line station) at the other end of Shepherd's Bush Green. Consequently, for 108 years there were two Tube stations of the same name just 0.3 miles (480 m) apart.

In 2008 the new London Overground Shepherd's Bush railway station was opened on the West London Line. To avoid the confusion of three stations named Shepherd's Bush, the Hammersmith & City line station was renamed Shepherd's Bush Market on 12 October 2008. The other two on the Central line and the West London line are close to each other, and interchange is allowed but not with Shepherd's Bush Market tube station.

== Locale ==
The station is at the western end of Shepherd's Bush Green, and stands just across the road from the marketplace which gives it its name. Stallholders have traded on the strip of land beside the railway line since 1914, when the market took over the station's first site. The other end of the market is served by Goldhawk Road Underground station.

Shepherd's Bush Market station is located close to various entertainment venues, including the Bush Theatre and the Shepherd's Bush Empire. It is also one of the Underground stations which serves Loftus Road Football Stadium: the home of Queens Park Rangers football club.

== Connections ==
London Buses routes 207 and 260, Superloop express route SL8, and night route N207 serve the station.

== See also ==
- Shepherd's Bush Market
- Shepherd's Bush stations

Preceding station	London Underground	Following station
Goldhawk Road towards Hammersmith	Circle line	Wood Lane towards Edgware Road via Aldgate
Goldhawk Road towards Hammersmith	Hammersmith & City line	Wood Lane towards Barking
Former service
Preceding station	London Underground	Following station
Hammersmith Terminus	Metropolitan line Hammersmith branch (1864-1908)	Latimer Road towards Paddington
Hammersmith Terminus	Metropolitan line Hammersmith branch (1908-1914)	Wood Lane towards Paddington
Goldhawk Road towards Hammersmith	Metropolitan line Hammersmith branch (1914-1914)	Wood Lane towards Paddington
Goldhawk Road towards Hammersmith	Metropolitan line Hammersmith branch (1914-1920)	Latimer Road towards Paddington
Goldhawk Road towards Hammersmith	Metropolitan line Hammersmith branch (1920-1959)	Wood Lane towards Paddington
Goldhawk Road towards Hammersmith	Metropolitan line Hammersmith branch (1959-1990)	Latimer Road towards Paddington
Hammersmith (Grove Road) towards Richmond	Metropolitan line 1877-1906	Latimer Road towards Paddington
