= Shepherd's Bush Market =

Street market in London

Coordinates: 51.5040°N 0.2266°W

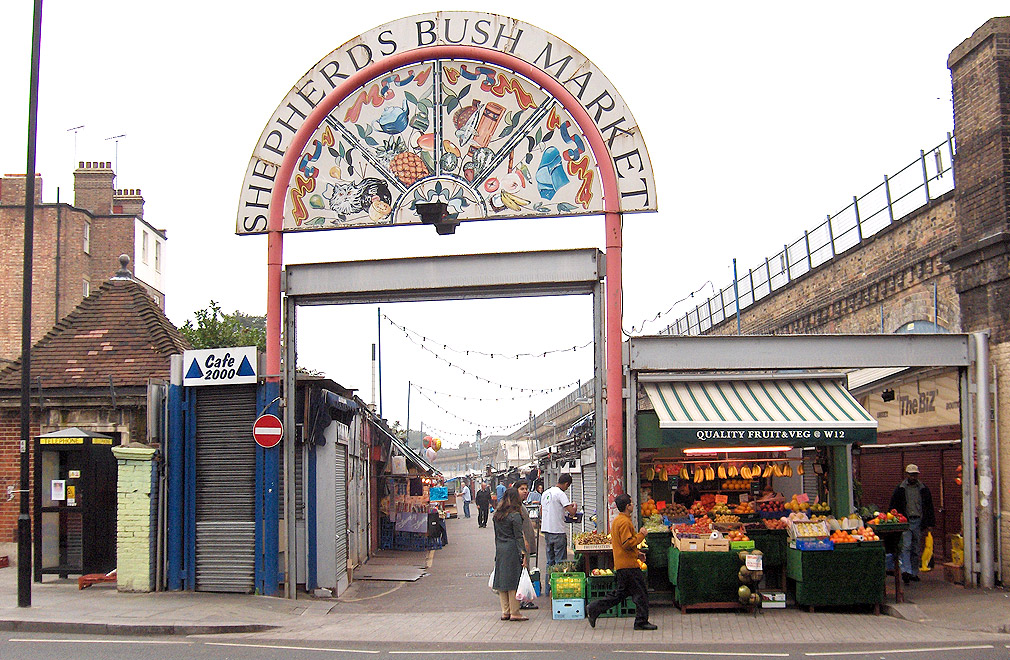
Shepherd's Bush Market viewed from the Uxbridge Road, 2006.

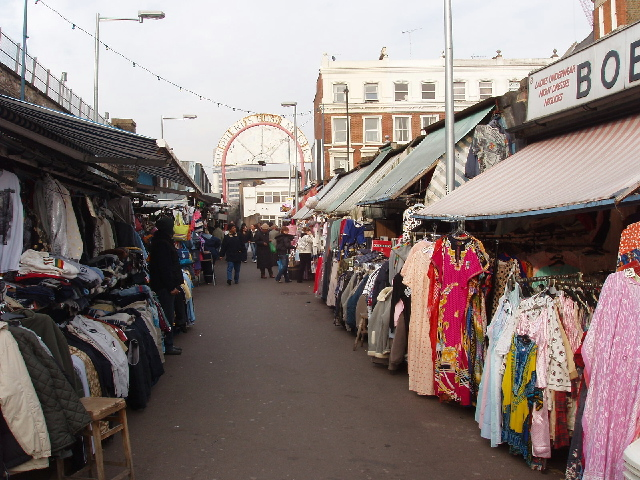
Shepherd's Bush Market, looking north

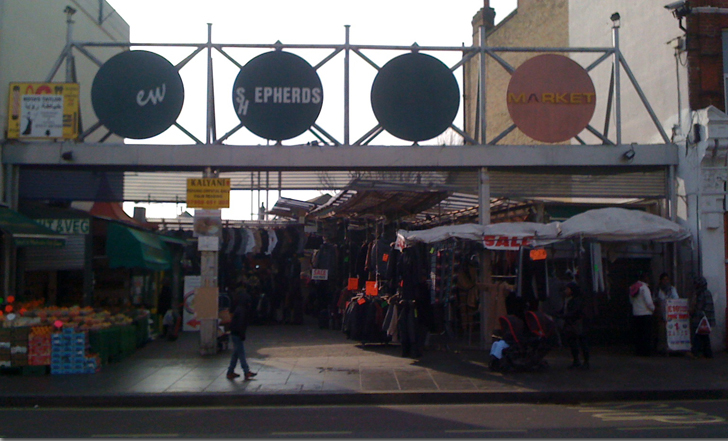
New Shepherds Bush Market, not to be confused with Shepherd's Bush Market

Shepherd's Bush Market is a street market in Shepherd's Bush, London. The market is located on the east side of the railway viaduct for the Hammersmith and City Tube line, and is bordered on the north side by the Uxbridge Road, and on the south by the Goldhawk Road.

== History ==
The market dates back to the early part of the twentieth century, when the present layout of the Hammersmith and City tube line was fixed. The market opened for business in around 1914, with shops lining the railway viaduct. It was closed briefly in 1915 to make way for the billeted troops but was given a new lease of life in 1918 as soldiers returning from the Western Front were offered stalls to help restart their lives.

== The market today ==
Individual market vendors sell a wide variety of goods today, including fresh produce, fabrics, household goods and clothing. There are also a number of cafes and restaurants selling falafel, Ethiopian food, Chinese food and pizza.

In September 2020, Yoo Capital became the majority owners of Shepherd's Bush Market.

== Information ==
The market, conveniently located between Shepherd's Bush Market underground station and Goldhawk Road station, is open Monday to Saturday from 8am – 6pm and will be open from 10am to 4pm on Sundays from June–September 2021. Individual vendor opening times may vary.

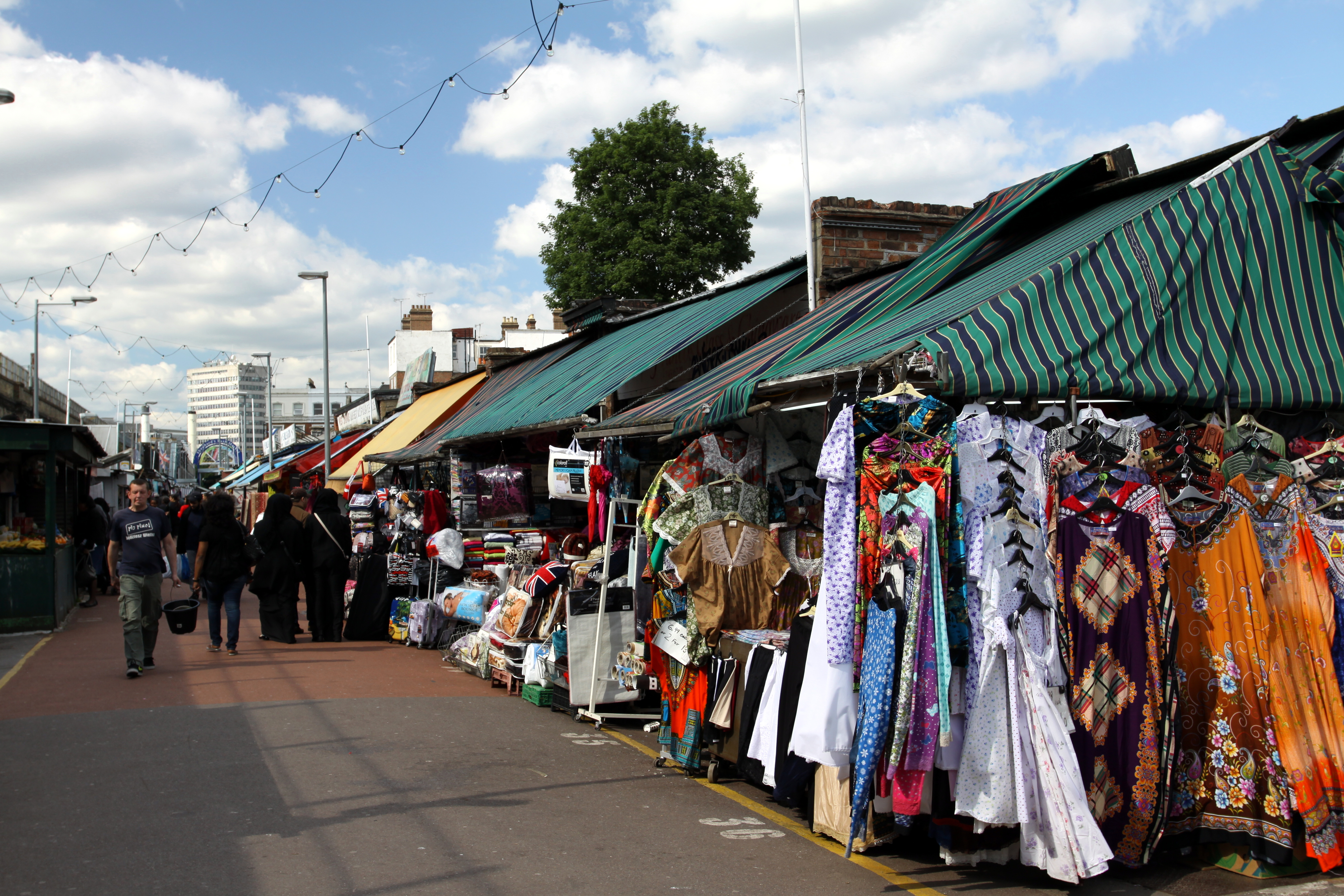
Shepherd's Bush Market in spring 2013

== See also ==
- History of Shepherd's Bush
- List of markets in London
- Shepherd's Bush
- Shepherd's Bush Market tube station
