= Hammersmith & City line =

London Underground line

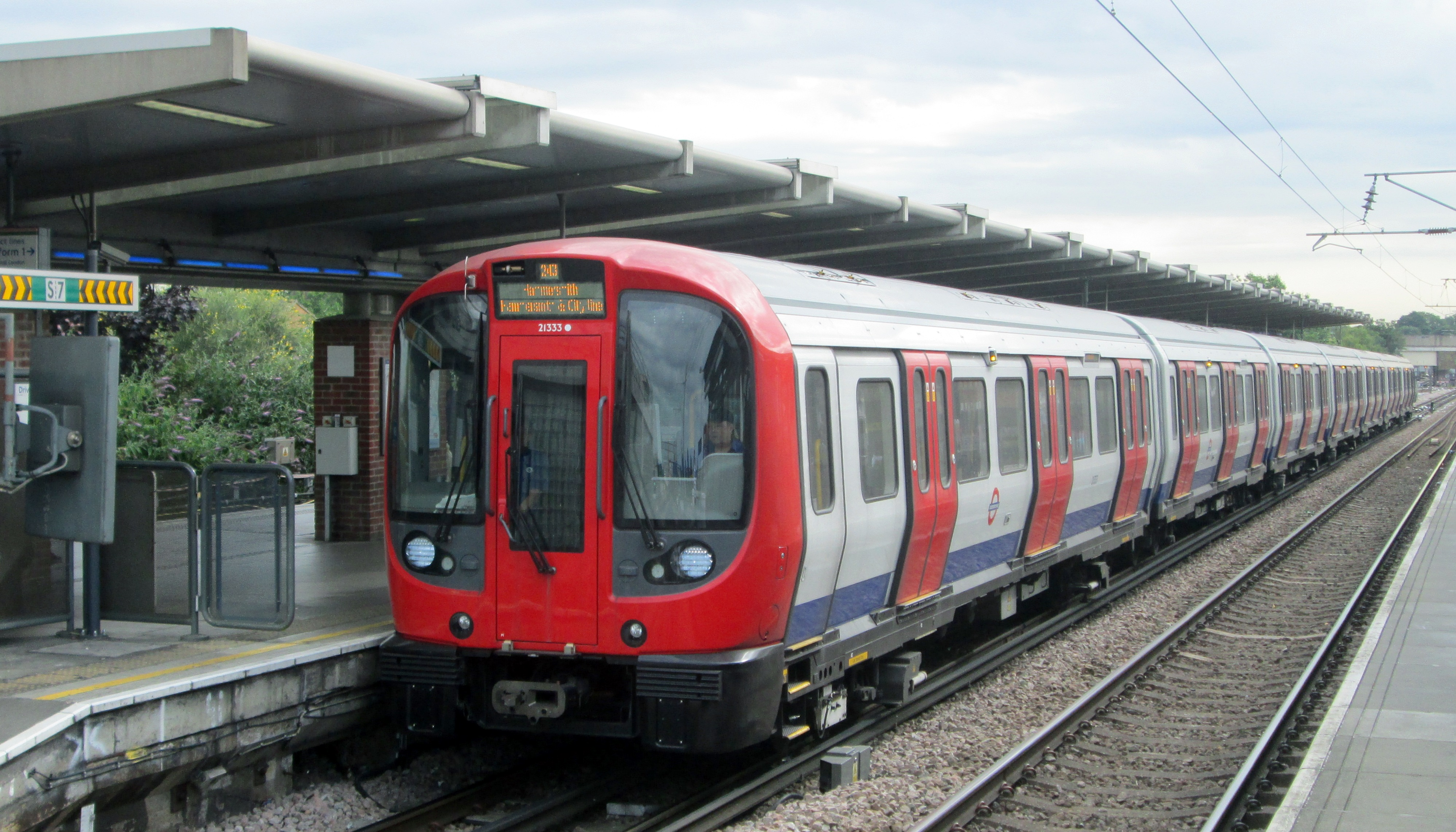
- A Hammersmith & City line train at West Ham, bound for Hammersmith

Overview
- Termini: Barking; Hammersmith
- Stations: 29
- Colour on map: Pink
- Website: tfl.gov.uk/tube/route/hammersmith-city

Service
- Type: Rapid transit
- System: London Underground
- Depot: Hammersmith
- Rolling stock: S7 Stock
- Ridership: 141.627 million (2019) (Note: combined figures for Circle and Hammersmith & City lines) passenger journeys

History
- Opened: 10 January 1863; 163 years ago (Note: Renamed to Hammersmith & City line in 30 July 1990; 36 years ago.)
- Last extension: 1936

Technical
- Line length: 25.5 km (15.8 mi)
- Character: Sub-surface
- Track gauge: 1,435 mm (4 ft 8 1/2 in) standard gauge
Transport for London rail lines
London Underground
Bakerloo
Central
Circle
District
Hammersmith & City
Jubilee
Metropolitan
Northern
Piccadilly
Victoria
Waterloo & City
London Overground
Liberty
Lioness
Mildmay
Suffragette
Weaver
Windrush
Other TfL Modes
DLR
Elizabeth line
London Trams

The Hammersmith & City line is a London Underground line that runs between Hammersmith in west London and Barking in east London. Coloured pink on the Tube map, it serves 29 stations over 15.8 miles (25.5 km). Between Farringdon and Aldgate East it skirts the City of London, the capital's financial heart, hence the line's name. Its tunnels are just below the surface and are a similar size to those on British main lines. Most of the track and all stations are shared with the Circle, District or Metropolitan lines. Over 141 million passenger journeys are made each year on the Hammersmith & City line.

In 1863, the Metropolitan Railway began the world's first underground railway service between Paddington and Farringdon with wooden carriages hauled by steam locomotives. The following year, a railway west from Paddington to Hammersmith was opened and this soon became operated and owned jointly by the Metropolitan and Great Western Railway companies. The line was then extended to the east, in stages, reaching the East London Railway in 1884. The line was electrified in 1906, and, in 1936, after the Metropolitan Railway had been absorbed by the London Passenger Transport Board, some Hammersmith & City line trains were extended over the former District Railway line to Barking. The Hammersmith & City route was shown on the Tube map as part of the Metropolitan line until 30 July 1990, when it was redesignated as a separate line.

Starting in 2015, the signalling system was upgraded as part of a programme to increase peak-hour capacity on the line. The six-car C Stock trains were replaced from 2012 to 2014 by new seven-car S Stock trains.

The line runs parallel to the Great Western Main Line between Paddington and Westbourne Park, and parallel to the London, Tilbury and Southend line between Bromley-by-Bow and Barking.

== History ==
=== Metropolitan Railway ===
Hammersmith and City Railway Act 1861
- Act of Parliament
- Parliament of the United Kingdom
- Long title: An Act for making a Railway from the Great Western Railway to Hammersmith, to be called "The Hammersmith and City Railway," and for other Purposes.
- Citation: 24 & 25 Vict. c. clxiv

Dates
- Royal assent: 22 July 1861

The first line built by the Metropolitan Railway (Met) was from Paddington to near Smithfield, near London's financial heart in the City; with gas-lit wooden carriages hauled by steam locomotives. Authorised by the Hammersmith and City Railway Act 1861 (24 & 25 Vict. c. clxiv), and opened on 10 January 1863, it was the world's first underground railway. The line was built mostly under the New Road using the "cut-and-cover" method between Paddington and King's Cross and then in tunnel and cuttings beside Farringdon Road. Supported by the Met and the Great Western Railway (GWR), the Hammersmith and City Railway (H&CR) was built from the GWR's main line a mile west of Paddington station to the developing suburbs of Shepherd's Bush and Hammersmith. Built on viaduct largely across open fields, the line opened on 13 June 1864 with a GWR service from Farringdon to Hammersmith, services to Addison Road (now Kensington (Olympia)) on the West London Railway via a link at Latimer Road starting a few weeks later. From 1865, the Met ran trains to Hammersmith and the GWR trains to Addison Road. (Note: In August 1872, the Addison Road service became the Middle Circle when extended over the District Railway to Earl's Court and onto Mansion House. From 1 July 1900 the service was cut back to run from Earl's Court to Aldgate before being withdrawn in January 1905.) In 1867, the line became jointly owned by the two companies. In 1871, two additional tracks parallel to the GWR between Westbourne Park and Paddington were brought into use for the H&CR, and in 1878 the flat crossing at Westbourne Park was replaced by a dive-under. A year earlier some services had been extended via London & South Western Railway's Hammersmith (Grove Road) railway station and their line to Richmond.

The railway was extended east of Farringdon and a terminus opened at Aldgate on 18 November 1876. The Met wished to access the South Eastern Railway via the East London Railway (ELR) and jointly with the District Railway built lines from their Mansion House station to the Met's Aldgate station and east from Aldgate to reach the ELR at Whitechapel. In October 1884, the Met extended some Hammersmith services over the ELR to New Cross.

In 1902, the Whitechapel and Bow Railway was opened, linking the District Railway at Whitechapel to the London, Tilbury and Southend Railway (LT&SR) at an above-ground junction at Bow, to the west of Bromley-by-Bow station, and some District services were extended from Whitechapel to East Ham. In 1906, the line was electrified and this necessitated a dedicated power station located at Park Royal along with three substation. The lines from Latimer Road to Addison Road were also included. At the same time services to Richmond were withdrawn and the western termini became Hammersmith and Kensington (Addison Road), and to the east services were diverted from the ELR to Whitechapel, until the ELR was electrified in 1914 and services ran from Hammersmith to New Cross (SER) and New Cross (LB&SCR). The 6-car electric multiple units were jointly owned by the Met and GWR until 1923 when the GWR sold theirs to the Met.

=== London Transport ===
On 1 July 1933, the Metropolitan Railway was amalgamated with other Underground railways, tramway companies and bus operators to form the London Passenger Transport Board. To relieve congestion on the District line east of Whitechapel from 1936 some Hammersmith & City line trains were diverted from the East London line to Barking. Through trains to New Cross and New Cross Gate were withdrawn in November 1939, the Hammersmith & City line trains terminating at Whitechapel while the longer 8-car Uxbridge line trains ran to Barking. However, this caused operational problems and from 1941 Barking was again served by trains from Hammersmith.

From 1937, new steel O stock trains, with doors remotely operated by the guard, replaced the wooden-bodied trains dating from 1906. It had been intended to operate the new trains with four or six cars, but after initial problems with the traction current only six-car formations were used. Services to Kensington (Olympia) via the curve at Latimer Road were suspended for the duration of World War II after bomb damage to the West London line in 1940. When the similar trains running on the Circle line were lengthened to six cars in 1959 and 1960, the stock of the two lines was integrated with maintenance at Hammersmith depot. Aluminium C Stock trains, with public address systems and originally unpainted, replaced these trains from 1970. One person operation was proposed in 1972, but due to conflict with the trade unions was not introduced until 1984.

=== A separate identity ===
The Hammersmith & City line was shown on the tube map as part of the Metropolitan line until 1990, when it became separated, and the Metropolitan line became the route from Aldgate to Baker Street and northwards through "Metro-land" to Uxbridge, Watford and Amersham. In June 1990, London Transport was considering potential colours and names for the separately identified line. Expected to be called "Hammersmith and City" and coloured salmon pink on the Tube map, the final decision was to be made in July. The new identity, launched on 31 July 1990, was marked by the release of several hundred pink balloons.

In 2003, the infrastructure of the Hammersmith & City line was partly privatised in a public–private partnership, managed by the Metronet consortium. Metronet went into administration in 2007 and the local government body Transport for London took over responsibilities. The reconstruction of Whitechapel station as part of the Crossrail project required the reversing platforms to be taken out of use and since December 2009 all services have been extended to Plaistow or Barking.

Beginning in 2012, following the complete replacement of the Metropolitan line's A Stock with S8 Stock, the C Stock trains of the Circle and Hammersmith & City lines were replaced by the S7 Stock. The Hammersmith & City line received the S7 Stock first, with the first train entering service on 6 July 2012, running a shuttle service between Hammersmith and Moorgate before operating between Hammersmith and Barking on 9 December 2012. By March 2014, all services were provided by S7 Stock trains.

== Route ==
=== Map ===
The route of the Hammersmith & City line

The line is 15.8 miles (25.5 km) long with 29 stations, all of which are shared with other lines.

Almost all of its track is shared with the other London Underground sub-surface lines: from Hammersmith to Baker Street with the Circle line; from Baker Street to Liverpool Street with the Circle and Metropolitan lines; and from Aldgate East station to Barking with the District line. A short section between Paddington and Edgware Road is also shared with the District line, while a short section between Liverpool Street and Aldgate East is not shared with any other line.

The line is electrified with a four-rail DC system: a central conductor rail is energised at −210 V and a rail outside the running rails at +420 V, giving a potential difference of 630 V.

Much of the 2-mile-35-chain (3.9 km) double-track railway from the Hammersmith terminus to Westbourne Park station is on a 20-foot (6.1 m) high brick viaduct. After Westbourne Park the line passes beneath the Great Western Main Line re-surfacing at Royal Oak station and running alongside the main lines to Paddington station. The line enters a cutting just west of Paddington, with a cut-and-cover tunnel at the far eastern end of the platforms. It meets the Circle and District lines from Bayswater at Praed Street Junction before passing through Edgware Road station in a cutting. After King's Cross St Pancras the line is partly in cutting but mostly in the Clerkenwell Tunnels, just after which it passes over the Ray Street Gridiron that carries the route over the City Widened Lines used for Thameslink services. There are bay platforms at Moorgate. Just before Aldgate the line diverges from the Circle and Metropolitan lines, continuing eastwards to join the District line west of Aldgate East. The line passes over the Windrush line (on the East London line railway) at Whitechapel station continuing on the 2-mile (3.2 km) former Whitechapel and Bow Railway to Bow Road where it surfaces, and then to Bromley-by-Bow, where it runs alongside the London, Tilbury and Southend line from Fenchurch Street. At the next station, West Ham, there is a transfer with the Jubilee line, the Docklands Light Railway and London, Tilbury and Southend line. There is a bay platform at the next station, Plaistow, and the line terminates after two more stations at Barking.

== Services ==
As of December 2012, off-peak there are six trains per hour, calling at all stations, and requiring 15 trains for the peak-hour service. Together with the Circle line, over 114 million passenger journeys are made each year. The journey from Hammersmith to Barking takes one hour during off-peak times. The central section from Paddington to Aldgate East is in fare zone 1; stations to its west to Hammersmith and east to West Ham is in zone 2; Bromley-by-Bow and West Ham are in both zones 2 and 3; Plaistow and Upton Park in zone 3; East Ham is in both zones 3 and 4, whilst Barking is in zone 4 alone.

== Rolling stock ==
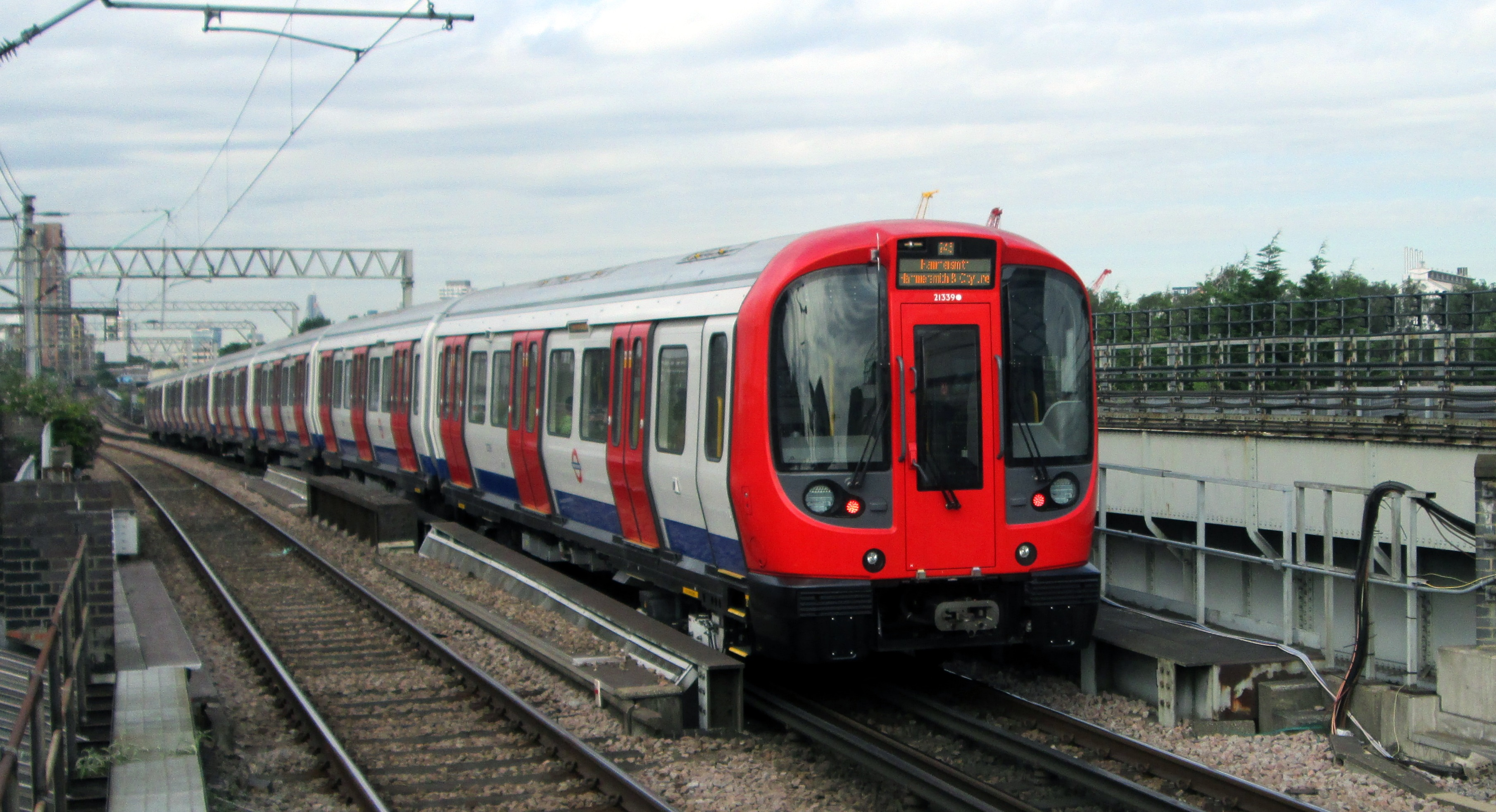
S7 Stock leaving West Ham station

Services are provided by S7 Stock trains, part of Bombardier's Movia family, with air-conditioning as the sub-surface tunnels (unlike those on the deep-level tube lines) are able to disperse the exhausted hot air. These trains have regenerative brakes, returning around 20 per cent of their energy to the network. With a top speed of 62 mph (100 km/h), a 7-car S Stock train has a capacity of 865 passengers, compared to 739 for the six-car C Stock train it replaced. With a length of 384 feet (117 m), S Stock trains are 79 feet (24 m) longer than 305-foot (93 m) long C Stock trains and station platforms have been lengthened. Traction voltage was increased in 2017, from the present nominal 630 V to 750 V to give better performance and allow the trains to return more energy to the network through their regenerative brakes.

== Depot ==
The line's depot is at Hammersmith, (Note: Position: 51°29′52″N 000°13′31″W) close to Hammersmith station, built by the Great Western Railway to be operated by the Metropolitan Railway when the joint railway was electrified in the early 20th century. Sidings at Barking and near High Street Kensington (Triangle Sidings) stable trains overnight. Sidings at Farringdon were used during the C stock era; due to the greater length of the new S stock trains, these are no longer in use.

== Four Lines Modernisation ==
It was planned that a new signalling system would be used first on the sub-surface lines from the end of 2016, but signalling contractor Bombardier was released from its contract by agreement in December 2013 amid heavy criticism of the procurement process and London Underground subsequently awarded the contract for the project to Thales in August 2015.

With the introduction of S7 Stock, the track, electrical supply, and signalling systems are being upgraded in a programme planned to increase peak-hour capacity on the line by 27 per cent by the end of 2023. A single control room for the sub-surface railway opened at Hammersmith on 6 May 2018, and Communications Based Control (CBTC) provided by Thales will progressively replace 'fixed block' signalling equipment dating back the 1940s.

The rollout of CBTC has been split into sections, each known as a Signal Migration Area (SMA), and are located on the line as follows:

Hammersmith & City line Signal Migration Areas
SMA (Note: SMAs 4–5 and 7–14 concern parts of the Circle, District, and Metropolitan lines.)	From	To	Status	Date
0.5	Hammersmith	Latimer Road	completed	March 2019
1	Latimer Road	Paddington	completed	September 2019
2	Paddington	Euston Square	completed	September 2019
3	Euston Square	Stepney Green	completed	July 2020
6	Stepney Green	Becontree	completed	January 2023

== List of stations ==
Station	Image	Opened	Additional information	Location
Hammersmith	A brown-bricked building with a rectangular, blue sign reading "HAMMERSMITH STATION" in white letters all under a grey sky	13 June 1864	Connects with District and Piccadilly lines. Moved to current position 1 December 1868.	51°29′39″N 000°13′30″W
Goldhawk Road	An entrance under a railway brick viaduct with a blue sign reading "GOLDHAWK ROAD STATION" in white letters and two women walking in front all under a grey sky	1 April 1914		51°30′07″N 000°13′37″W
Shepherd's Bush Market	A railway on a brick viaduct crosses a road on a steel bridge, with an entrance below a blue sign reading "SHEPHERD'S BUSH MARKET STATION" in white letters	13 June 1864	Moved to current position 1 April 1914. Renamed from "Shepherd's Bush" in 2008.	51°30′21″N 000°13′35″W
Wood Lane	A silver metal and glass building with a blue sign with "WOOD LANE STATION" in white letters	12 October 2008		51°30′35″N 000°13′27″W
Latimer Road	A railway on a brick viaduct crosses a road, an entrance in the brickwork below a sign reading "LATIMER ROAD STATION"	16 December 1868	Closed between 17 January and 1 August 2011 for refurbishment and extension works	51°30′50″N 000°13′02″W
Ladbroke Grove	A brick building with an entrance below a sign reading "LADBROKE GROVE STATION". Three people are in a group outside the entrance	13 June 1864	Opened as Notting Hill, renamed Notting Hill & Ladbroke Grove in 1880, Ladbroke Grove (North Kensington) in 1919 and Ladbroke Grove in 1938.	51°31′02″N 000°12′38″W
Westbourne Park	A dirty, white-bricked building with a rectangular, dark blue sign reading "WESTBOURNE PARK STATION" in white letters all under a blue sky	1 February 1866	Moved to current position 1 November 1871, and a Great Western Main Line station until 1992. (Note: Leboff (1994, p. 152) adds that the station opened as 'Westbourne Park & Kensal Green' and was served from the outset by the GWR, whereas Butt (1995, p. 244) gives the GWR serving from 1871.)	51°31′16″N 000°12′04″W
Royal Oak	A brown-bricked building with a rectangular, dark blue sign reading "ROYAL OAK STATION" in white letters all under a light blue sky	30 October 1871	Also a Great Western Main Line station until 1934.	51°31′09″N 000°11′17″W
Paddington	A platform with several people waiting for a train. A white square sign has a London Underground roundel with "PADDINGTON" in the centre. To the right there is a track with fourth track electrification and on an adjacent track a blue multiple unit train with red doors waits.	10 January 1863	Opened as Paddington (Bishop's Road), renamed in 1948. Connects with Bakerloo, Circle and District lines, Elizabeth line and Paddington main-line station.	51°31′07″N 000°10′46″W
Edgware Road	A tan-coloured building with brown-framed windows and a sign reading "METROPOLITAN EDGWARE ROAD STATION RAILWAY" in brown letters	10 January 1863	Connects with Circle and District lines.	51°31′12″N 000°10′04″W
Baker Street	A street filled with people in front of a light grey building that has variously coloured signs protruding from it stating a variety of different things	10 January 1863	Connects with Bakerloo, Jubilee and Metropolitan lines.	51°31′19″N 000°09′25″W
Great Portland Street	A beige-bricked building with a blue sign reading "GREAT PORTLAND STREET STATION" in white letters all under a blue sky with white clouds	10 January 1863	Opened as Portland Road, renamed Great Portland Street in 1917. Named Great Portland Street & Regent's Park 1923–33.	51°31′26″N 000°08′38″W
Euston Square	A building covered in windows with a blue sign reading "EUSTON SQUARE STATION" in white letters all under a blue sky with white clouds	10 January 1863	Opened as Gower Street and renamed in 1909. Closest Hammersmith & City line station to Euston main-line station.	51°31′33″N 000°08′09″W
King's Cross St Pancras	Beneath a blue sign reading "KING'S CROSS ST. PANCRAS UNDERGROUND STATION several people exit from an entrance leading to steps down. To the right there are silver doors under a sign reading "Lift". The sky is overcast, above the entrance is a dark blue temporary building	10 January 1863	Opened as King's Cross, renamed King's Cross & St. Pancras in 1925 and King's Cross St. Pancras in 1933. Moved to current position in 1941. Connects with Northern, Piccadilly and Victoria lines St Pancras and King's Cross main-line stations and international rail services.	51°31′49″N 000°07′27″W
Farringdon	A street view of a pale stone two storey building. Across the top of the building signs read "FARRINGDON & HIGH HOLBORN STATION" and "METROPOLITAN RAILWAY" in gold colour lettering. At ground level a canopy extends into the street around a blue sign reads "FARRINGDON STATION" with the London Underground roundel and National Rail symbols, and just above an entrance is a gold lettering reading "ENTRANCE". Either side of the entrance are shops, bicycles are in bicycle stands and people are walking on the pavement in front of the building	10 January 1863	Opened as Farringdon Street, and moved to current position in 1865. Renamed Farringdon & High Holborn in 1922 and Farringdon in 1936. Connects with Thameslink and Elizabeth line services.	51°31′12″N 000°06′19″W
Barbican	Across a road with a London taxi and a car is an entrance. This has people standing in it and above is a blue rectangular sign reading "BARBICAN STATION" in white and above this is a bridge linking the building	23 December 1865	Opened as Aldersgate Street, then Aldersgate in 1910, Aldersgate & Barbican in 1923 and Barbican in 1968.	51°31′13″N 000°05′52″W
Moorgate	Across a street and behind black bollards is a brick building of at least two storeys. The ground floor is stone coloured and two people are standing in a dark entrance beneath a blue rectangular sign reading "MOORGATE STATION" in white. Above this, attached to be wall at 90 degrees is a white rectangular sign with the National Rail logo and London Underground roundel. Above this, below three windows, blue lettering reads "MOORGATE STATION"	23 December 1865	Opened as Moorgate Street, renamed in 1924. Connects with Northern line and the main line. The Elizabeth line is interchangeable via the Northern Line platforms from Liverpool Street station due to the long platforms.	51°31′07″N 000°05′19″W
Liverpool Street	The end of a brick building with arched windows and sloping roofs lies between two towers with steeples. In front of this is a white metal and glass structure. People are standing and walking in the street in front.	11 July 1875	From February to July 1875 trains used platforms in the mainline station. Connects with Central, Circle and Metropolitan lines, Elizabeth line and Liverpool Street mainline station.	51°31′04″N 000°04′59″W
Aldgate East	In the middle of building works a glass doors show banisters leading down beneath a sign reading "ALDGATE EAST STATION", this beneath a canopy supported on four girders.	6 October 1884	Connects with District line. Moved to current position in 1938.	51°30′55″N 000°04′20″W
Whitechapel	Two entrances on the ground floor of what looks like a terraced house between a shop with green sign reading "Fresh" and a building with a sign reading "Lecture Hall" above a door	6 October 1884	Connects with Windrush line and Elizabeth line services. Opened as Whitechapel (Mile End), renamed in 1901. Metropolitan service began in 1906, and withdrawn 1913–36.	51°31′08″N 000°03′40″W
Stepney Green	A brick building under a slate roof with a pale front; two arched doorways on the left and four arched windows to the right, above which a rectangular, dark blue sign reading "STEPNEY GREEN STATION" in white letters	23 June 1902	Metropolitan service began in 1941.	51°31′19″N 000°02′47″W
Mile End	A grey-bricked building with a rectangular, dark blue sign reading "MILE END STATION" in white letters all under a light blue sky with white clouds	2 June 1902	Cross platform interchange with Central line. Metropolitan service began in 1936.	51°31′30″N 000°01′59″W
Bow Road ( at Bow Church)	A red-bricked building with a blue sign reading "BOW ROAD STATION" in white letters and a tree in the foreground all under a blue sky with white clouds	11 June 1902	Main-line station opened in 1876 and moved in 1892. Metropolitan service began in 1936, main-line station closed in 1947.	51°31′38″N 000°01′29″W
Bromley-by-Bow	A squat bricked building behind a concrete wall with a dark blue sign reading "BROMLEY-BY-BOW STATION" in white letters	2 June 1902	Opened as main-line station in 1894. First served as Bromley, Metropolitan service began in 1936, main-line station closed in 1940 and renamed in 1967.	51°31′26″N 000°00′41″W
West Ham	A brown-bricked building with a large, grey sign reading "WEST HAM" in white letters and four people in front all under a light grey sky	2 June 1902	Connects with Jubilee line, Docklands Light Railway and c2c services. Main-line station opened 1901, Named West Ham (Manor Road) from 1924 to 1969, Metropolitan service began in 1941 and main-line station closed 1994.	51°31′41″N 000°00′14″E
Plaistow	A red bricked cube shaped building with a rectangular, dark blue sign reading "PLAISTOW STATION" in white letters and people walking on the pavement in front	2 June 1902	Main-line station opened in 1858. Metropolitan service began in 1936.	51°31′53″N 000°01′02″E
Upton Park	A red-and-brown bricked building with a rectangular, dark blue sign reading "UPTON PARK STATION" in white letters all under a light blue sky	2 June 1902	Main-line station opened in 1877. Metropolitan service began in 1936.	51°32′06″N 000°02′04″E
East Ham	A red- and brown-bricked building with a blue sign reading "EAST HAM STATION" in white letters and people walking in front all under a white sky	2 June 1902	Main-line station opened in 1858. Metropolitan service began in 1936.	51°32′20″N 000°03′06″E
Barking	A glass and steel building with a canopy, a row of shops at ground level. There is a bus waiting at a bus stop in front of the building, and cars waiting with people. A sign above an entrance readings "Barking" with symbols for National Rail and London Underground.	2 June 1902	Connects with c2c, Suffragette line, and District line services to Upminster. Main-line station opened in 1854. District Railway service withdrawn 1905–1908. Metropolitan service began in 1936.	51°32′21″N 000°04′54″E

== Notes and references ==
=== Bibliography ===
- Bruce, J Graeme (1983). Steam to Silver. A history of London Transport Surface Rolling Stock. Capital Transport. ISBN 0-904711-45-5.
- Butt, R. V. J. (October 1995). The Directory of Railway Stations: details every public and private passenger station, halt, platform and stopping place, past and present (1st ed.). Sparkford: Patrick Stephens Ltd. ISBN 978-1-85260-508-7. OCLC 60251199. OL 11956311M.
- Day, John R. (1963). The Story of London's Underground (1st ed.). Westminster: London Transport.
- Green, Oliver (1987). The London Underground: An illustrated history. Ian Allan. ISBN 0-7110-1720-4.
- Horne, Mike (2003). The Metropolitan Line. Capital Transport. ISBN 1-85414-275-5.
- Horne, Mike (2006). The District Line. Capital Transport. ISBN 1-85414-292-5.
- Jackson, Alan (1986). London's Metropolitan Railway. David & Charles. ISBN 0-7153-8839-8.
- Leboff, David (1994). London Underground Stations. Ian Allan. ISBN 978-0-7110-2226-3.
- Rose, Douglas (December 2007) [1980]. The London Underground: A Diagrammatic History (8th ed.). Capital Transport. ISBN 978-1-85414-315-0.
- Wolmar, Christian (2004). The Subterranean Railway: how the London Underground was built and how it changed the city forever. Atlantic. ISBN 1-84354-023-1.
