= Shepherd's Bush =

Suburb of West London, England

Coordinates: 51.5042°N 0.2307°W

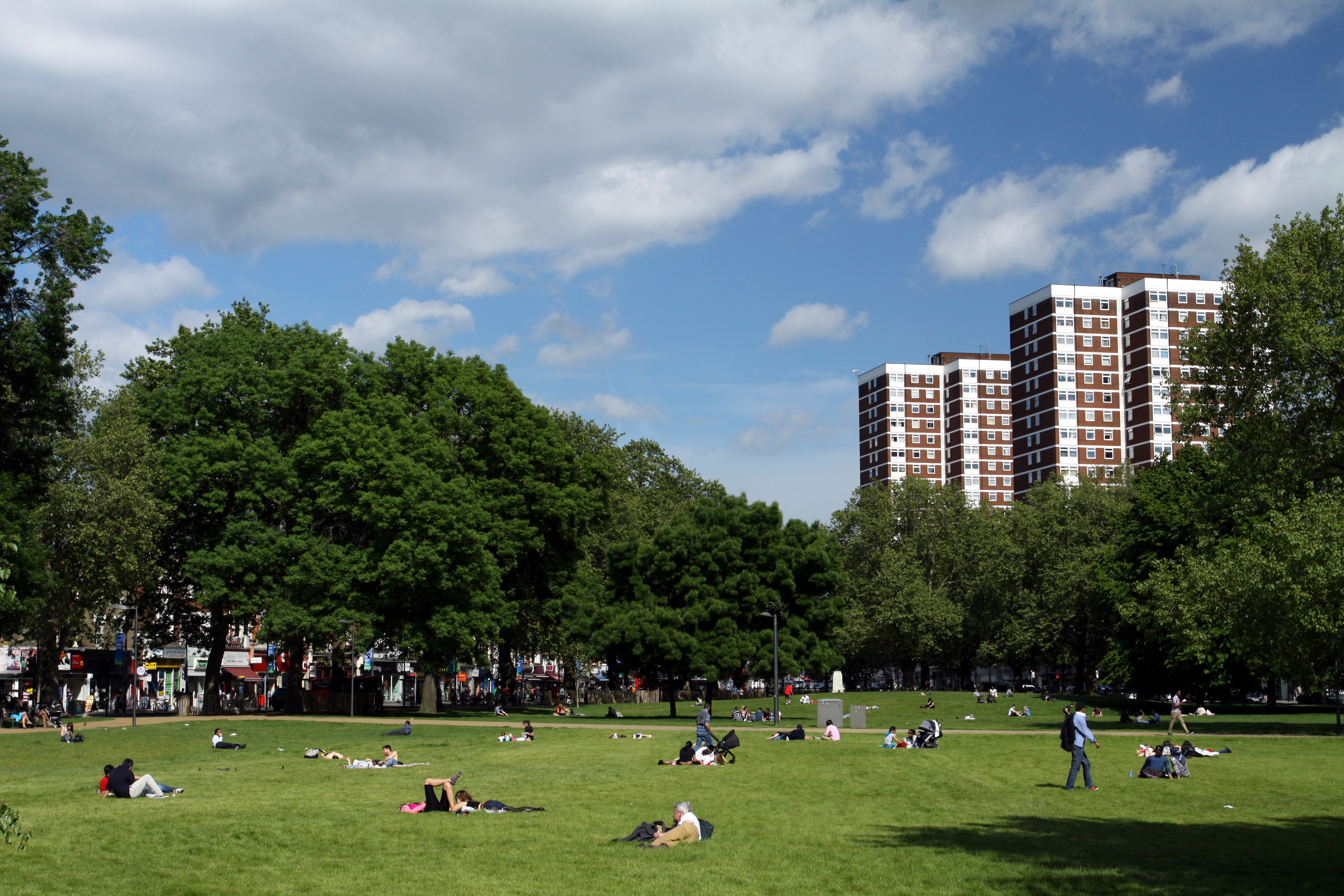
- Shepherd's Bush Green

- Location within Greater London
- OS grid reference: TQ235798
  - Charing Cross: 5 mi (8.0 km) E
- London borough: Hammersmith & Fulham
- Ceremonial county: Greater London
- Region: London
- Country: England
- Sovereign state: United Kingdom
- Post town: LONDON
- Postcode district: W12
- Dialling code: 020
- Police: Metropolitan
- Fire: London
- Ambulance: London
- UK Parliament: Hammersmith and Chiswick
- London Assembly: West Central

Shepherd's Bush is a suburb of West London, England, within the London Borough of Hammersmith and Fulham 4.9 miles (7.9 km) west of Charing Cross, and identified as a major metropolitan centre in the London Plan.

Although primarily residential in character, its focus is the shopping area of Shepherd's Bush Green, with the Westfield London shopping centre a short distance to the north. The main thoroughfares are Uxbridge Road, Goldhawk Road and Askew Road, all with small and mostly independent shops, pubs and restaurants. Loftus Road football stadium in Shepherd's Bush is home to Queens Park Rangers. In 2011, the population of the area was 39,724.

The district is bounded by Hammersmith to the south, Holland Park and Notting Hill to the east, Harlesden and Kensal Green to the north and by Acton and Chiswick to the west. White City forms the northern part of Shepherd's Bush. Shepherd's Bush comprises the Shepherd's Bush Green, Askew, College Park & Old Oak, and Wormholt and White City wards of the borough.

== History ==
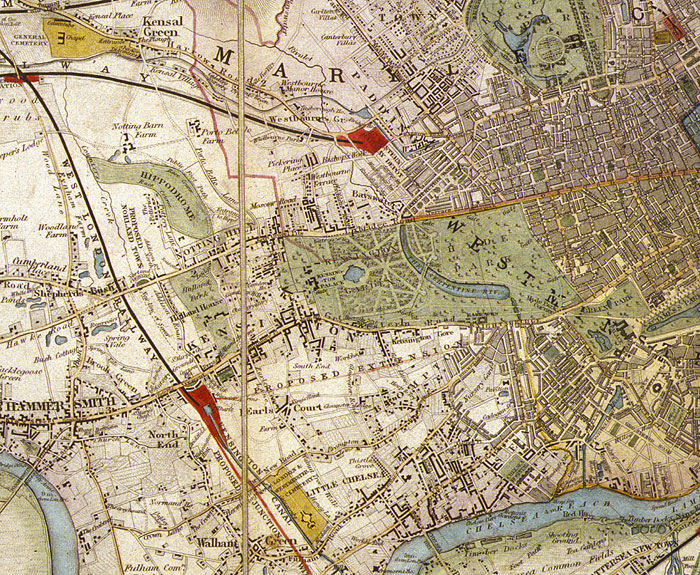
1841 map of London showing a largely rural Shepherd's Bush (far left).

=== Origins ===
The name Shepherd's Bush is thought to have originated from the use of the common land here as a resting point for shepherds on their way to Smithfield Market in the City of London. An alternative theory is that it could have been named after someone in the area, because in 1635 the area was recorded as "Sheppard's Bush Green".

Evidence of human habitation can be traced back to the Iron Age. Shepherd's Bush enters the written record in the year 704 when it was bought by Waldhere, Bishop of London as a part of the "Fulanham" estate.

=== 19th century ===
Until 1834, Shepherd's Bush was part of the ancient parish of Fulham, when it became part of the civil parish of Hammersmith. It was anciently in Middlesex, from 1856 was part of the area of the Metropolitan Board of Works, and joined the County of London when that was created in 1889.

A map of Middlesex dated 1841 shows Shepherd's Bush to be largely undeveloped and chiefly rural in character, with much open farmland, compared with fast-developing Hammersmith. Residential development began in earnest in the late 19th century, as London's population expanded relentlessly. In 1904 the Roman Catholic Church of the Holy Ghost and St Stephen, built in the Gothic style with a triple-gabled facade of red brick and Portland stone, was completed and opened for use.

=== 20th century ===
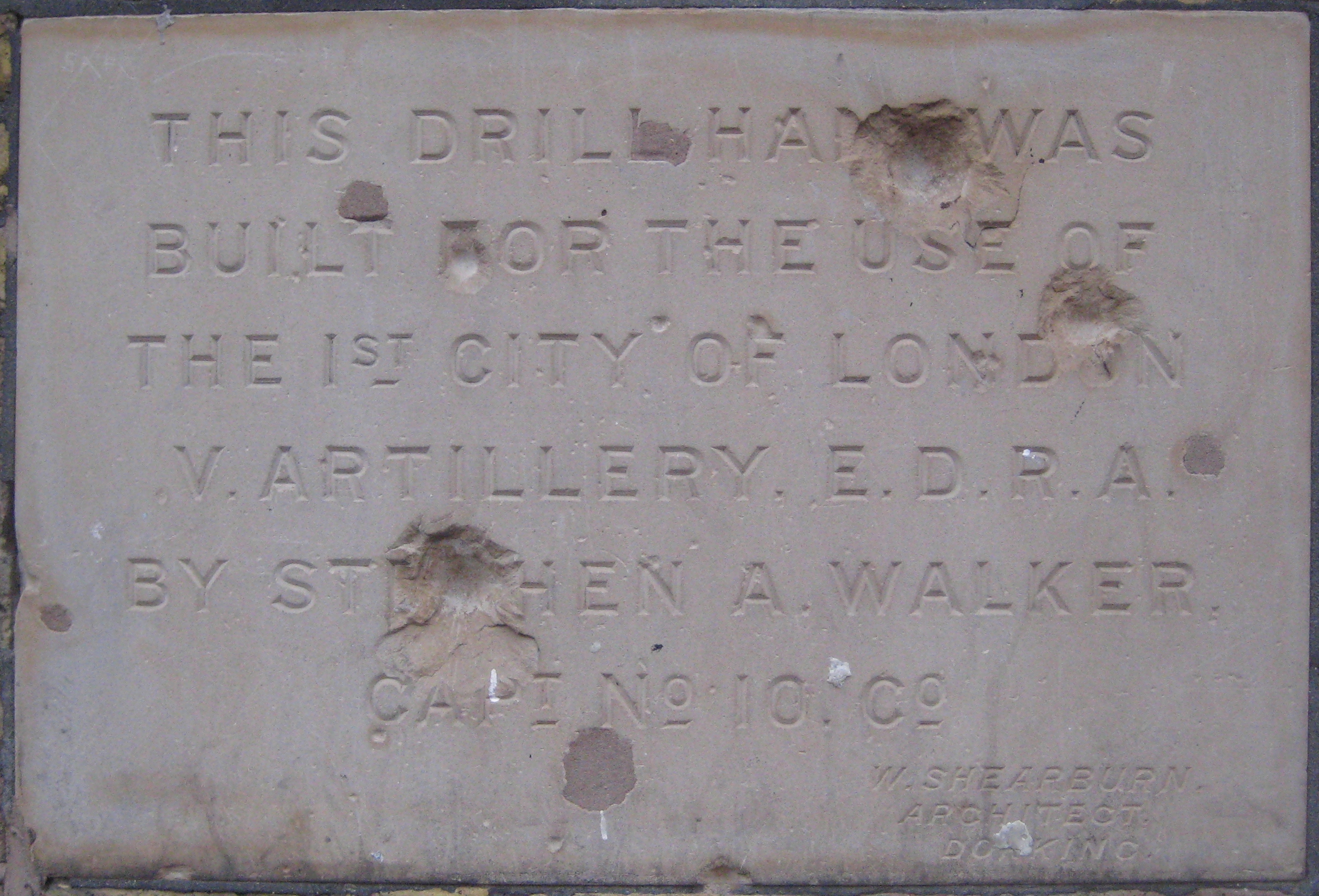
Foundation stone of a building in Shepherd's Bush showing Second World War shrapnel damage.

Like other parts of London, Shepherd's Bush suffered from bomb damage during World War II, especially from V-1 flying bomb attacks (known as "doodlebugs" or "buzzbombs"), which struck randomly and with little warning.

On 13 April 1963, the Beatles recorded their first-ever BBC Television broadcast at Lime Grove Studios in Shepherd's Bush. The group returned in 1964 for a further recording. Lime Grove Studios was demolished in 1994 to make way for residential accommodation.

More recently, the White City bus station is housed in the redeveloped Dimco Buildings (1898), Grade II listed red brick buildings which were originally built in 1898 as a shed for a London Underground power station. The Dimco buildings were used as a filming location for the 'Acme Factory' in the 1988 film Who Framed Roger Rabbit, and later served as the interior of the British Museum in The Mummy Returns.

== Geography ==
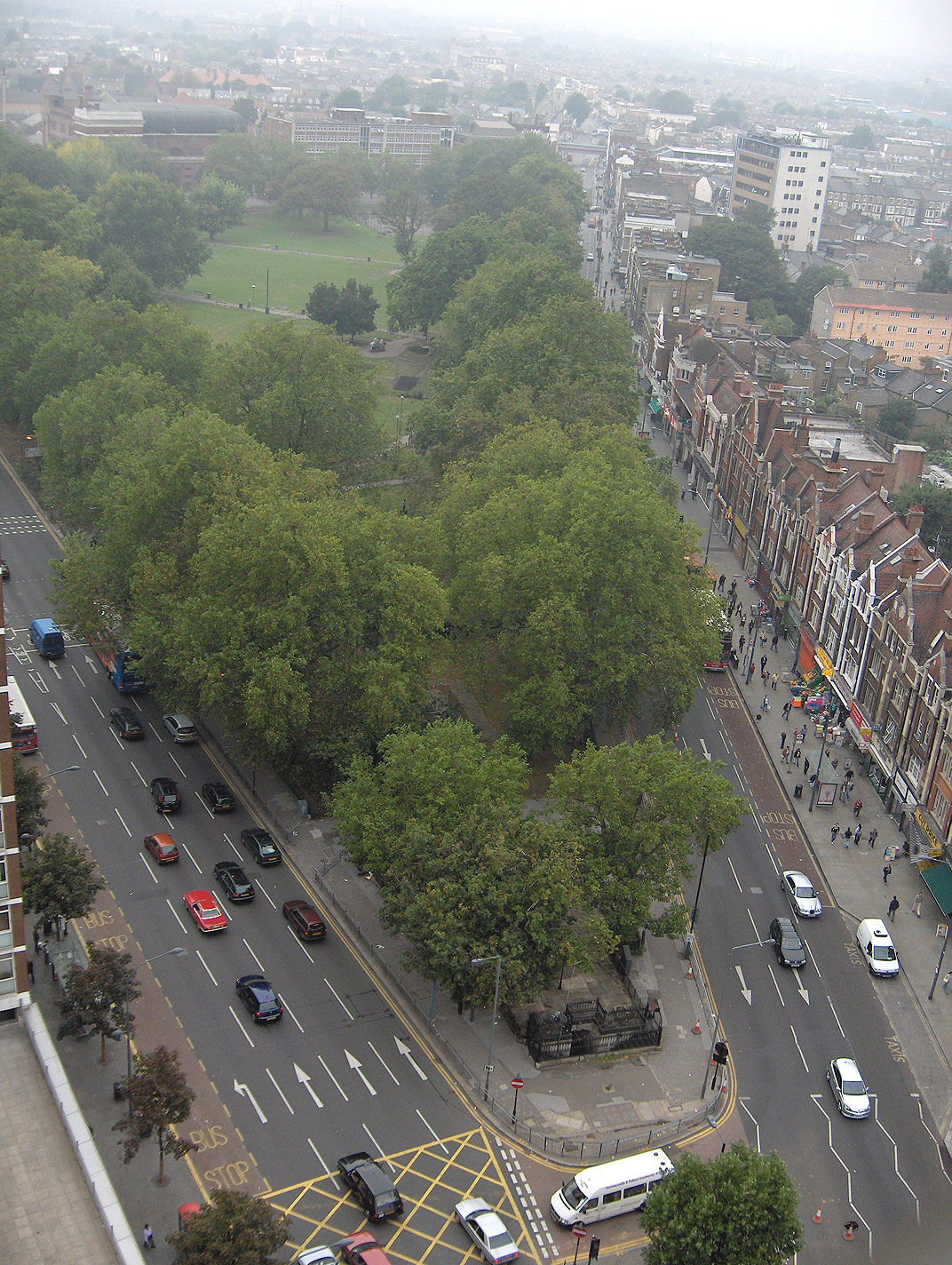
Shepherd's Bush Green, seen from a nearby tower block in September 2006.

The area's focal point is Shepherd's Bush Green (also known as Shepherds Bush Common), a triangular area of about 8 acres (3 ha) of open grass surrounded by trees and roads with shops, with Westfield shopping centre to its north.

The Green is a hub on the local road network, with four main roads radiating from the western side of the green and three roads approaching its eastern apex, meeting at the large Holland Park Roundabout. This position makes it an important node of the bus network, with eighteen bus routes arriving there. It is also served by five London Underground stations (see Transport below): Shepherd's Bush and White City both on the Central line, and Shepherd's Bush Market, Goldhawk Road and Wood Lane all on the Hammersmith & City and Circle lines.

To the east, Shepherd's Bush is bounded by the physical barrier of the West London railway line and the grade-separated West Cross Route (part of the aborted 1960s London Motorway Box scheme); the Holland Park Roundabout and the small Addison Bridge to the south are the only ways to cross this barrier from Shepherds Bush.

Most of the areas to the east of the barrier differ significantly in character, being associated with the more affluent Holland Park and Notting Hill; although the Edward Woods Estate just to the north-east of the roundabout is part of and is managed by the London Borough of Hammersmith and Fulham.

To the south, Shepherd's Bush neighbours Brook Green and Hammersmith.

== Commerce ==
Commercial activity in Shepherd's Bush is now focused on the Westfield shopping centre next to Shepherd's Bush Central line station and on the many small shops which run along the northern side of the Green.

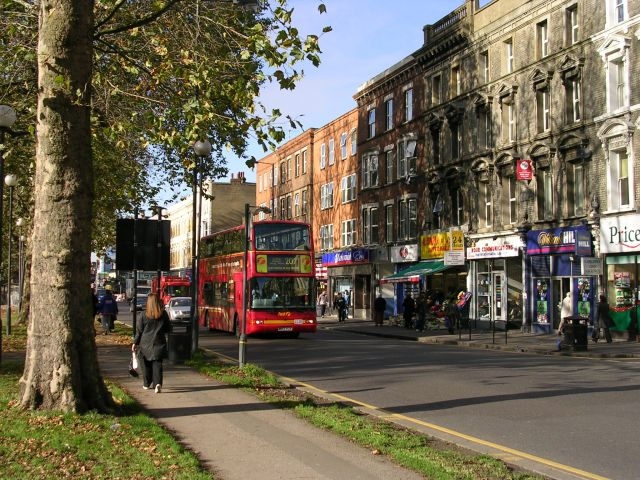
Shops on Uxbridge Road on the north side of the Green

Originally built in the 1970s with a rooftop car park and connecting bridge to the station, the older West 12 Shepherds Bush shopping centre was significantly redeveloped in the 1990s. The bridge was removed, and the centre now houses several chain stores, a 12-screen cinema, gym, pub, restaurants, a medical practice and a supermarket.

The small shops continue along many of the most popular roads within Shepherd's Bush, such as Uxbridge Road. Many of these establishments cater for the local ethnic minority communities. For example, a relatively large proportion of the local shops on Goldhawk Road (south of the Green) are dedicated to Ethiopian culture, whether that be through food, clothing or barbershops. (see Demographics).

Running parallel to, and partly under, an elevated section of the Hammersmith & City line there is a large permanent market, the Shepherd's Bush Market, selling all types of foodstuffs, cooked food, household goods, clothing and bric-à-brac.

The Westfield Group (with Hausinvest Europa) opened a shopping centre in October 2008.

== Office buildings ==
As well as the offices within the Television Centre on Wood Lane, opposite this is Network House, 1 Ariel Way, a 20,000 sq ft (2,000 m^{2}) building that was let by Frost Meadowcroft on behalf of Westfield to Zodiak Entertainment in September 2009 and in Rockley Road is the 160,000 sq ft (15,000 m^{2}) Shepherds Building where Endemol another TV company are based and where Jellycat, a soft toy company, relocated their head office to in February 2010.

== Residential ==
The residential areas of Shepherd's Bush are primarily located to the west of the Green, either side of Uxbridge Road and Goldhawk Road to the southwest, and about as far as Askew Road in the west. Much of the housing in this area consists of three- or four-storey terraces dating from the late 19th century, and subsequently divided up into small flats.

Shepherd's Bush is also home to the White City Estate, a housing estate that was originally constructed in the 1930s and further extended after the war in the early 1950s. It was built on the site of the grounds of the 1908 Franco-British Exhibition and close to the White City Stadium and has given its name to the northern part of Shepherd's Bush known as White City.

The London Borough of Hammersmith and Fulham has created the Shepherd's Bush Conservation Area in order to promote the protection of local buildings of historic interest, and improve the character of the neighbourhood.

== Transport ==
=== Rail and Tube ===
Shepherd's Bush is a major transport interchange in west London. Five London Underground stations serve the area, including:

- Shepherd's Bush – at the eastern apex of Shepherd's Bush Green, near the Westfield shopping centre
- Shepherd's Bush Market – to the north-west of the Green, on Uxbridge Road
- Goldhawk Road – to the south-west of the Green, on Goldhawk Road
- White City – to the north of the Westfield shopping centre
- Wood Lane – to the north of the Westfield shopping centre

All stations are in London fare zone 2.

The Central line links the area to Ealing and areas of north-west London, such as Greenford and Ruislip. To the east, the line links Shepherd's Bush to London's West End, the City, and Stratford.

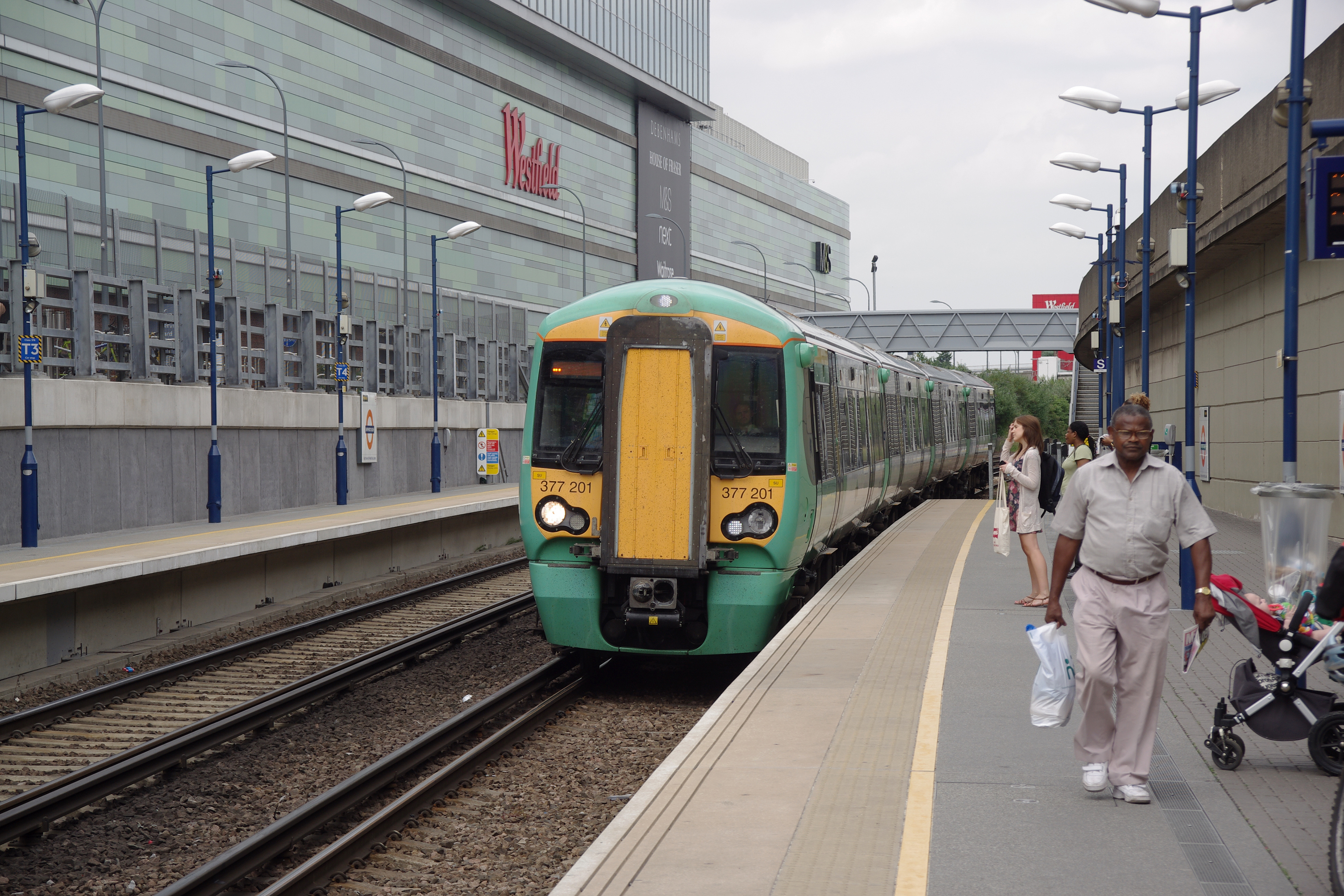
Trains from Shepherd's Bush station are operated by London Overground and Southern forming part of the London Overground network's Mildmay line. Destinations include Croydon, Milton Keynes, Stratford, and Watford.

The Circle and Hammersmith & City lines share the same route through the area, with direct services southbound to nearby Hammersmith. To the north, the lines curve eastwards towards Latimer Road and Ladbroke Grove. The lines then run directly to key destinations such as Paddington, King's Cross, Moorgate in the city, and the East End.

Shepherd's Bush railway station is served by National Rail trains, operated by London Overground and Southern forming part of the London Overgound network's Mildmay line. There are direct services from Shepherd's Bush to Kensington, and Clapham Junction and Balham, both of which are based in the south-west of London, and Croydon in the south east of London. Northbound Southern services link the area to Wembley, Watford, Hemel Hempstead, and Milton Keynes. London Overground services running northbound travel towards Willesden Junction, where services continue towards West Hampstead, Camden, Hackney, and Stratford in east London. The station is an out-of-station interchange with Shepherd's Bush tube station on the Central line, and is situated on the western side of Holland Park Roundabout.

=== Bus ===
There are two main bus interchanges in Shepherd's Bush.

London Buses routes 31, 49, 72, 94, 95, 148, 207, 220, 228, 237, 260, 272, 283, 295, 316, SL8, N72, N207, and C1 serve Shepherd's Bush Green and the southern side of the Westfield shopping centre.

Most of these routes also serve White City bus station on the northern side of Westfield.

Shepherd's Bush was also the proposed terminus of the West London Tram, an on-street light rail line running to Uxbridge via Acton, Ealing and Southall. This project was cancelled in 2007

in favour of an enhanced bus service and the development of Crossrail.

=== Cycling ===
Cycle lanes run around the southern rim of the Holland Park Roundabout on the eastern side of Shepherd's Bush. This provides cyclists with traffic-free access from Holland Park Avenue to Shepherd's Bush Green.

Transport for London (TfL) proposes that a cycle spur will link the roundabout to Cycleway 9, which is intended to run along Kensington High Street.

The Santander Cycles bicycle-sharing system operates around Shepherd's Bush, with docking stations near Westfield, Wood Lane station, and Shepherd's Bush Road.

=== Road ===
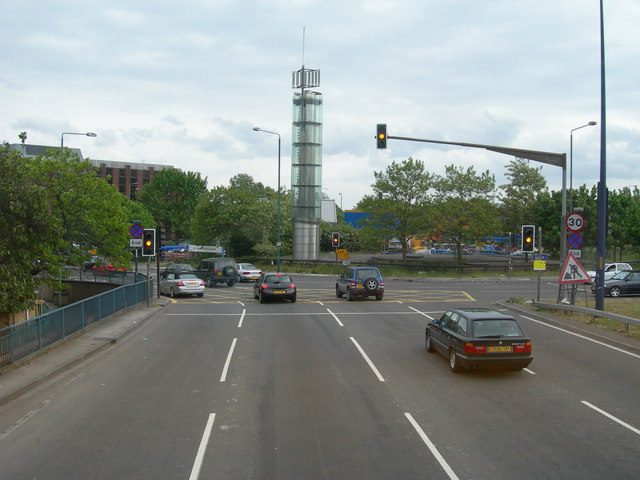
The end of the West Cross Route, facing Holland Park Roundabout.

The A3220/West Cross Route runs along the eastern rim of the district. Until 2000, the route was the M41 motorway, part of the abandoned London Ringways network of orbital roads in London. Despite not retaining motorway status, pedal cycles are prohibited from using the route northbound. The A3220 links Shepherd's Bush with the A40/Westway to the north. This provides the area with a dual-carriageway link to Paddington and Marylebone to the east, and westbound to Acton and the M40 motorway. Southbound, the A3220 is named Holland Road and links the area to Earl's Court, the A4, and Chelsea.

Other key routes through Shepherd's Bush include:

- the A219 (Wood Lane/Shepherd's Bush Road) – northbound to White City, Wormwood Scrubs, and Harlesden, southbound to Hammersmith, Fulham, and Putney;
- the A402 (Goldhawk Road/Holland Park Avenue) – westbound to Chiswick, eastbound to Notting Hill Gate, Marble Arch, and Oxford Street;
- the A4020 (Uxbridge Road) – westbound to Acton and Ealing.

== In popular culture ==
=== Arts and entertainment ===
The junkyard in the sitcom Steptoe & Son was situated at the fictional Oil Drum Lane, Shepherd's Bush. It is often referred to in the BBC series Absolutely Fabulous where the main character, Edina Monsoon, owns her home but prefers to say she lives in the more upmarket Holland Park, nearby.

The BBC used to have a number of offices in Shepherd's Bush; however, many have now been closed or moved. They included the Lime Grove Studios on the site of previous film studios Gaumont and Gainsborough Pictures. Sulgrave House, Threshold and Union Houses and Kensington House—now a hotel. The BBC's presence in the Bush is now concentrated in two huge sites on Wood Lane, Television Centre and the White City building. The Media Village was built next to the White City building in the mid-1980s on the former site of the White City Stadium. It is used by the BBC and other media companies including Red Bee Media (formerly BBC Broadcast, now a private company). Television Centre was the national home of BBC Television, and it is from there that BBC TV and radio news, the BBC website and a host of TV drama and light entertainment were broadcast. The BBC moved all of its news operations from Television Centre to Broadcasting House in central London in 2012.

Shepherd's Bush Green The newly regenerated Green in 2012–13 was the site for the public sculptures Goaloids by Fine Artist Elliott Brook. This Inspire Mark (awarded by LOCOG (London Organising Committee of the Olympic and Paralympic Games) making it part of the Cultural Olympiad) artwork was installed on Shepherd's Bush Green for the duration of London 2012 and the Paralympic Games. These large unique rotating football related sculptures commemorated the history of Shepherd's Bush and White City, which hosted the 1908 Summer Olympics football. The London Borough of Hammersmith and Fulham is the only Borough to have three football teams playing Premier League Football.

Bush Theatre is a writing theatre, situated on the Green.

Shepherd's Bush Empire is a music venue and former television studio, and has played host to a number of acts and TV programmes, including David Bowie, Rolling Stones, Bob Dylan, The Old Grey Whistle Test, Wogan, That's Life!, Crackerjack, and This Is Your Life.

Bush Hall is a venue at 310 Uxbridge Road, built in 1904 as a dance hall. It predominantly showcases smaller acoustic performers.

Shepherd's Bush Walkabout was a music and live sports venue located on the western end of the green, and home to the West London Wildcats and Shepherds Bush Raiders Aussie Rules teams. On Australian and New Zealand national holidays, big sporting events such as the National Rugby League Grand Final, Rugby Championship and Bledisloe Cup Rugby Union test matches, Australian Football League grand final, memorial days such as Waitangi Day, Australia Day, and Anzac Day, and on Sundays after The Church, the Shepherd's Bush Walkabout was the centre of Antipodean life in London. The live music was usually a mixture of up and coming local acts, and cover bands who played Australian and New Zealand classic songs and contemporary popular music. Shepherd's Bush Walkabout closed in early October 2013 and it was announced the site would be redeveloped into a hotel.

A number of influential music groups originate from in and around Shepherd's Bush. The Who infused much of their work with the youth culture of Shepherd's Bush during the 1960s and 1970s. Steve Jones, guitarist of punk legends the Sex Pistols, was born in Shepherd's Bush, and Pistols drummer Paul Cook grew up here. The Clash's early work is infused with the culture of Shepherd's Bush and the Westway. Libertines and Babyshambles frontman Pete Doherty moved to Shepherd's Bush at age 16. Tony Butler, bass-player with 1980s band Big Country and others, was born in Shepherd's Bush. Bands Bush and Symposium hail from Shepherd's Bush, the former taking their name from the area.

Classical musicians Evelyn Glennie and Robert Steadman have both lived in Shepherd's Bush.

In the Westfield shopping centre area at White City, the grade II listed Dimco buildings (1898), now redeveloped as a bus station, were used as the location for the 'Acme Factory' in the 1988 film Who Framed Roger Rabbit.

=== Sports ===
Shepherd's Bush is home to Queens Park Rangers football club, who play their home games in Loftus Road. Olympic gold medal winner Linford Christie also grew up in Shepherd's Bush and lived in Loftus Road as a child. A stadium on nearby Wormwood Scrubs is named the Linford Christie Stadium in his honour. Some of the football games in the 1908 Olympics were hosted in Shepherd's Bush. Shepherds Bush F.C. were the local side until 1915.

Former England national rugby union team captain Lawrence Dallaglio was born in Shepherd's Bush.

The London Borough of Hammersmith and Fulham has created the Shepherd's Bush Conservation Area in order to promote the protection of local buildings of historic interest, and improve the character of the neighbourhood.

== Politics ==
At Westminster, Shepherd's Bush is represented by Andy Slaughter, the Labour Party MP for the constituency of Hammersmith and Chiswick, which includes Shepherd's Bush.

== Gallery ==
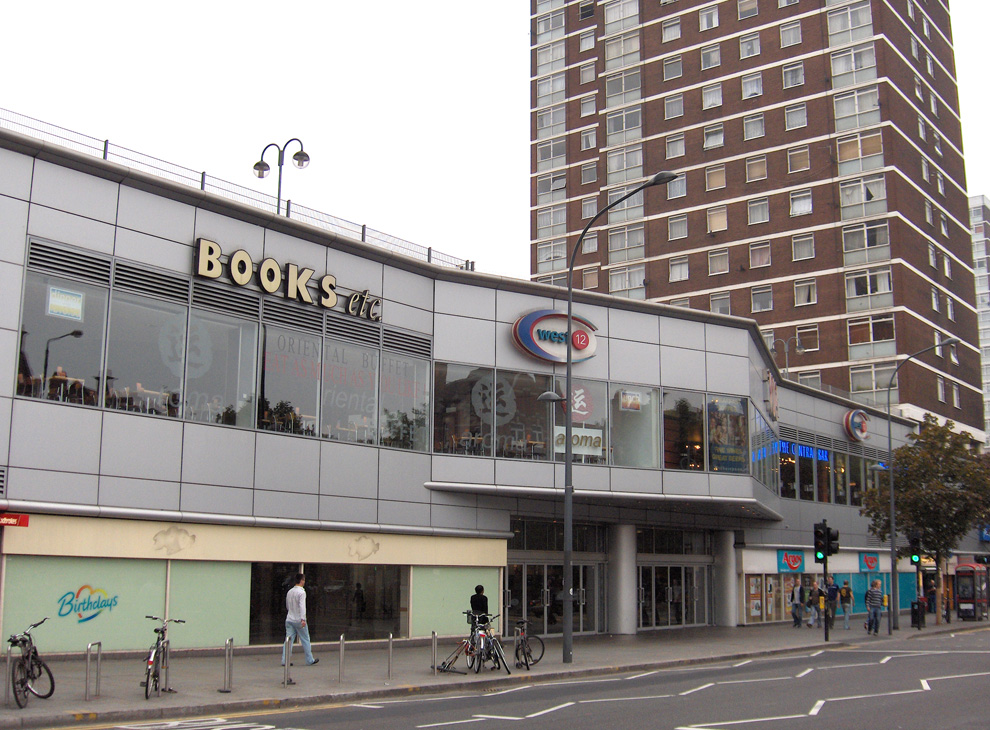
Shepherds Bush's West 12 Shopping Centre, north entrance (2006)

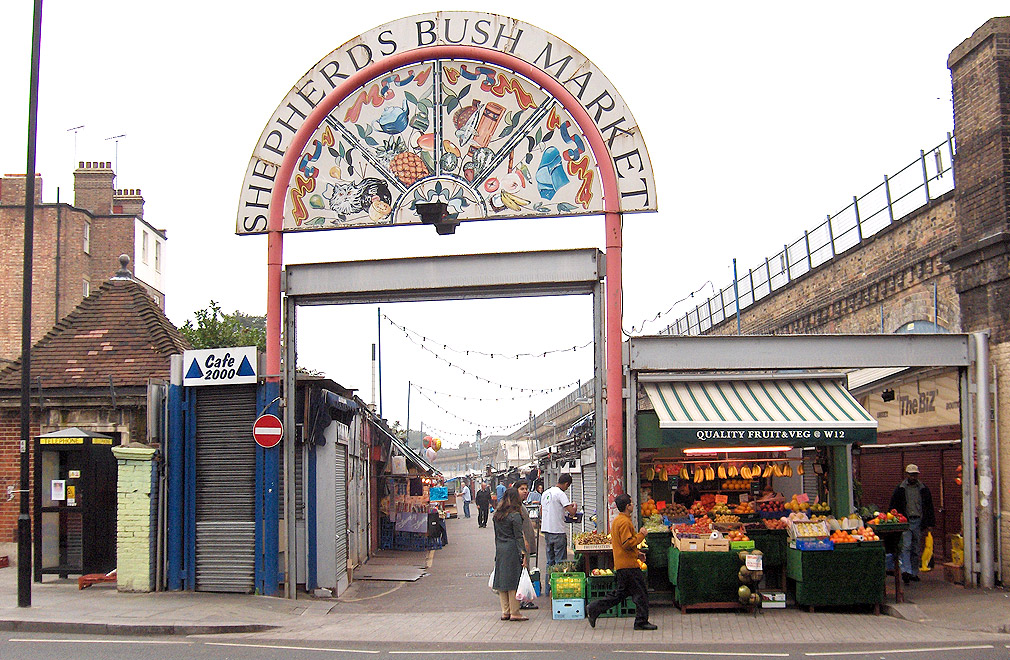
Shepherd's Bush Market, early morning, from the Uxbridge Road end (2006)

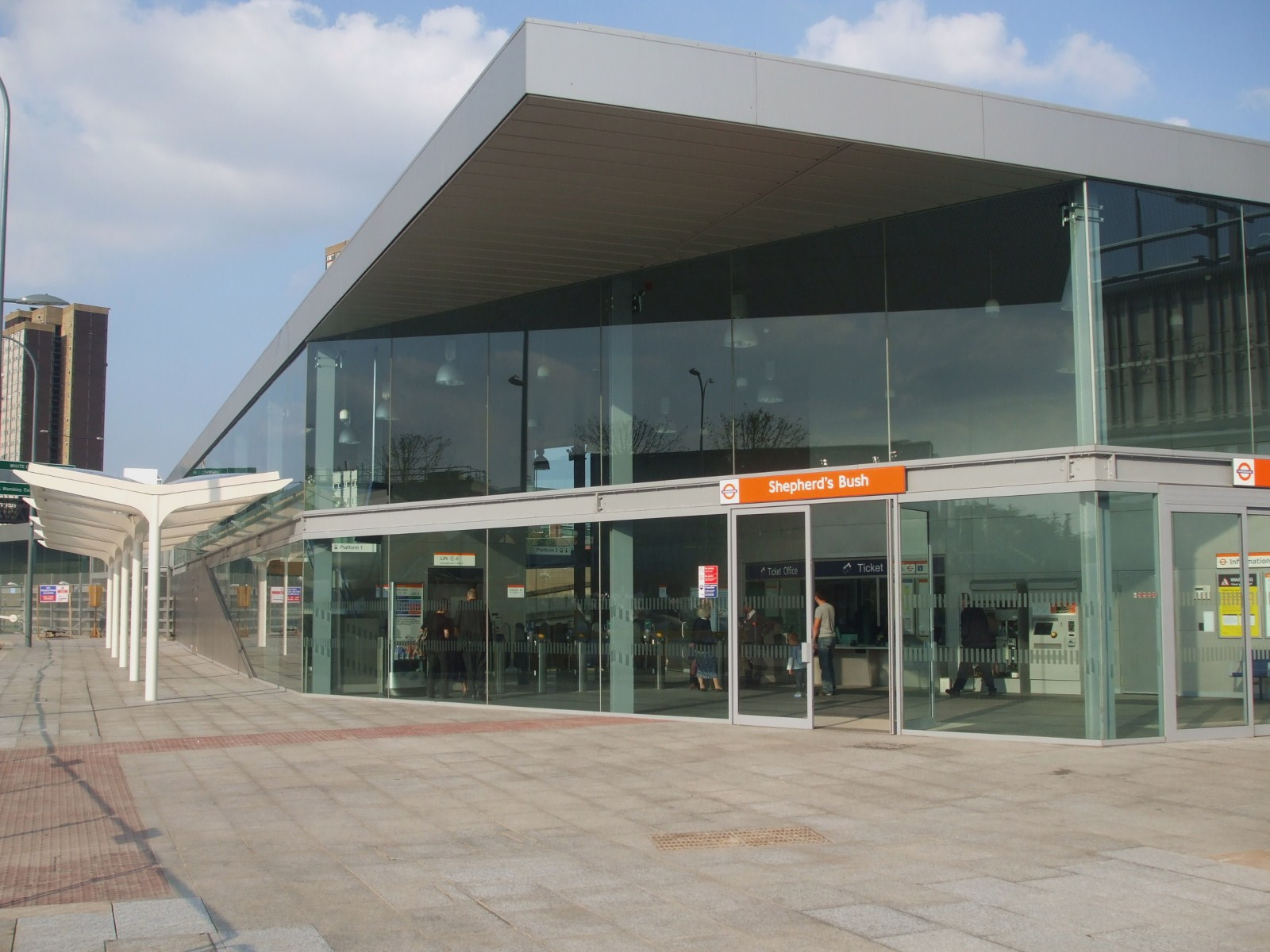
The new Shepherd's Bush Overground station, opened in 2008

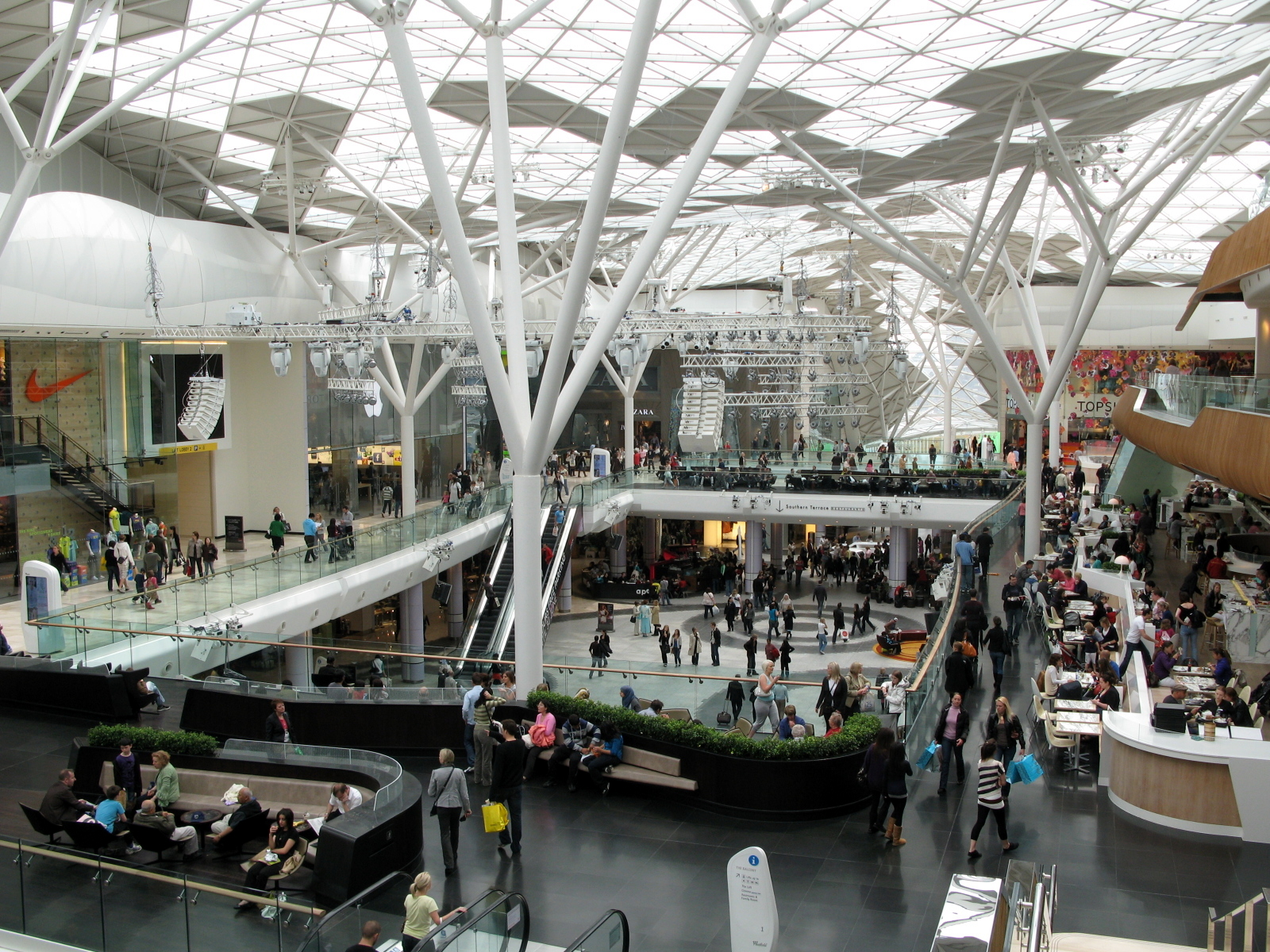
Westfield Shopping Centre

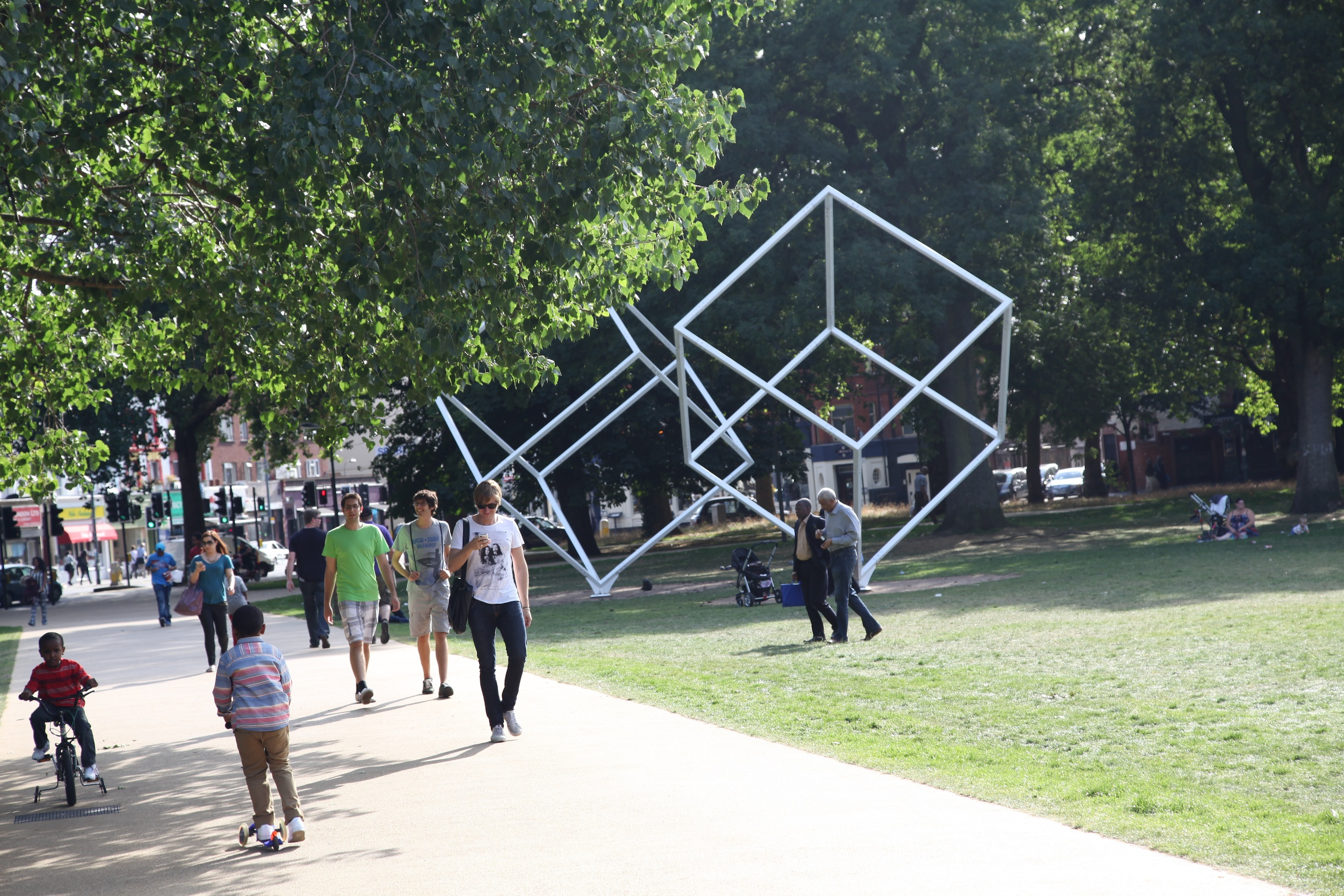
Goaloids by Artist Elliott Brook Shepherd's Bush Green (installed 2012)

== See also ==
- History of Shepherd's Bush
- Shepherd's Bush Green
- Little Australia
