= Shepherd's Bush Conservation Area =

Coordinates: 51°30′15.14″N 0°13′21.14″W

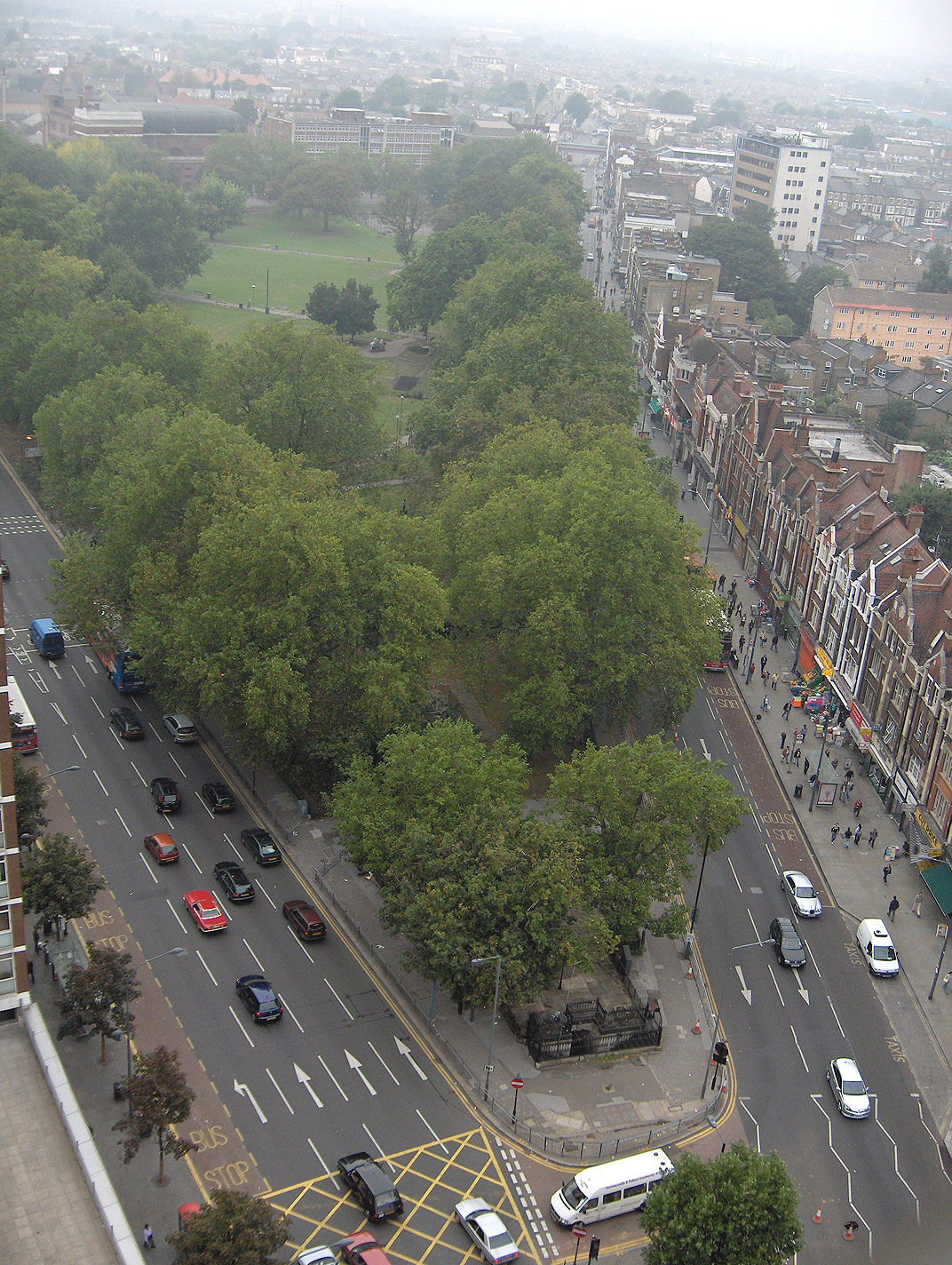
Aerial view of Shepherd's Bush Green, which forms the largest part of the Shepherd's Bush Conservation Area

The Shepherd's Bush Conservation Area is a part of Shepherd's Bush, London, that has been established by the London Borough of Hammersmith and Fulham in order to promote the protection of local buildings of historic interest, and improve the character of the neighbourhood.

Generally, in the United Kingdom, the term Conservation Area nearly always applies to an area (usually urban or the core of a village) considered worthy of preservation or enhancement because of its special architectural or historic interest, "the character or appearance of which it is desirable to preserve or enhance", as required by the Planning (Listed Buildings and Conservation Areas) Act 1990 (Section 69 and 70). More than 8000 have been designated.

The Shepherd's Bush Conservation Area is one of a number of areas in Hammersmith and Fulham which have been designated for conservation. Broadly speaking it encompasses Shepherd's Bush Green and its immediate environs, including many streets north of the Green (south of the Westfield Centre).

== Future ==
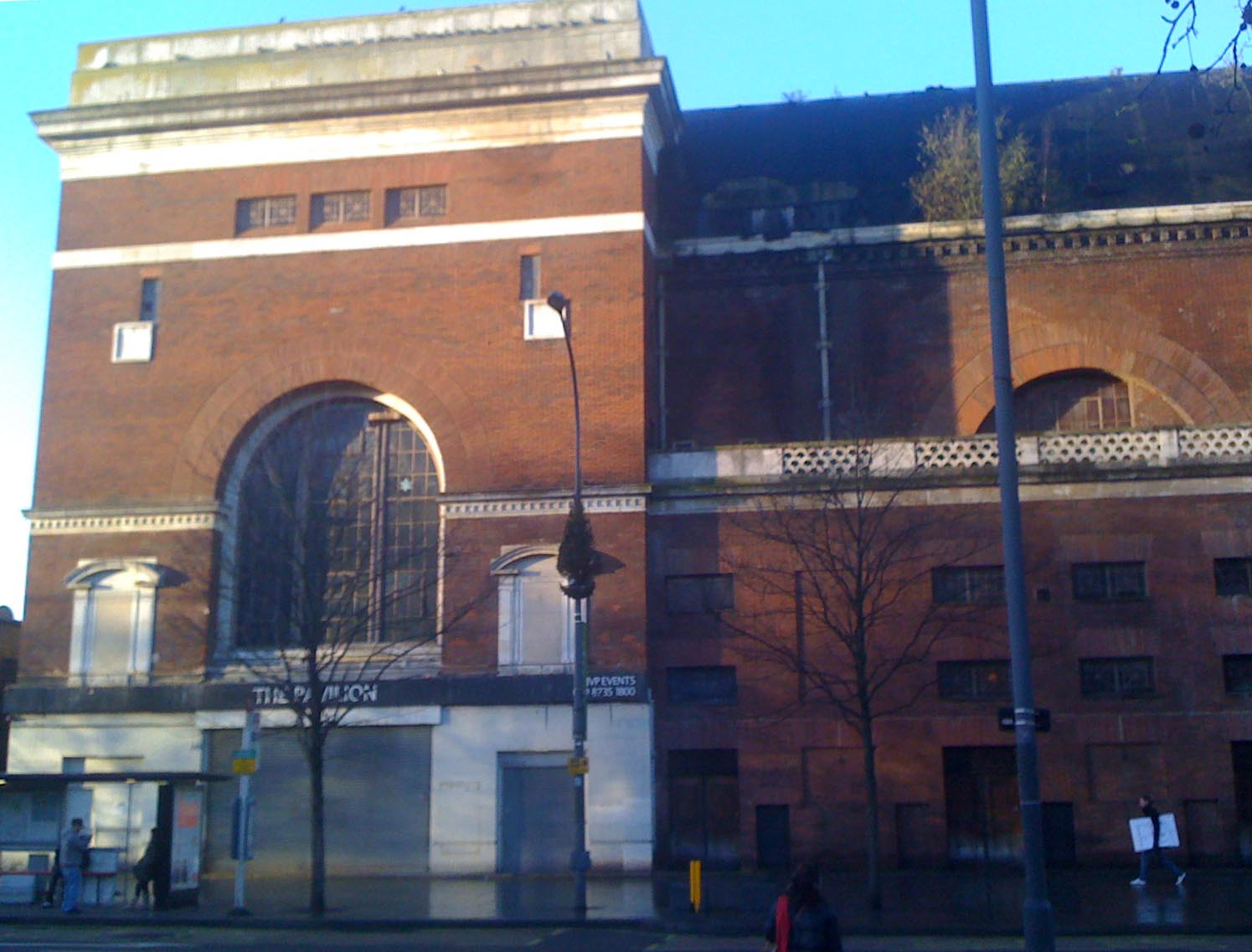
The Shepherd's Bush Pavilion - a luxury hotel

Plans have been drawn up by the London Borough of Hammersmith and Fulham to substantially re-develop Shepherd's Bush Green, also known as the Common. The plans include creating two new play areas for children, the planting of further trees and a general improvement to routes across the Green for both cyclists and pedestrians. A proposal to create a new cafe was declined by the planning authorities.

The Shepherd’s Bush Pavilion is located on the west side of Shepherd's Bush Green and was built as a cinema in 1923. Planning permission has been granted to convert it into a luxury hotel.

Shepherd's Bush Market is the subject of a regeneration plan by the London Borough of Hammersmith and Fulham. In September 2010 a revised planning and regeneration brief was issued. In February 2011 the Fulham and Hammersmith Chronicle reported that plans included 250 flats, and also rehousing the existing tenants, many of whom objected to the plans. In July 2011 former Mayor of London Ken Livingstone visited the market to add his voice to those opposed to the Council's plans for regeneration of the area.

An Ibis Hotel opened in 2013 on the south side of the Green.

== See also ==
- Shepherd's Bush
- History of Shepherd's Bush
