= List of schools in the London Borough of Hammersmith and Fulham =

This is a list of schools in the London Borough of Hammersmith and Fulham, England.

== State-funded schools ==
=== Primary schools ===
- Addison Primary School
- All Saints CE Primary School
- Ark Bentworth Primary Academy
- Ark Conway Primary Academy
- Ark White City Primary Academy
- Avonmore Primary School
- Brackenbury Primary School
- Earl's Court Free School Primary
- Flora Gardens Primary School
- Fulham Primary School
- Good Shepherd RC Primary School
- Greenside Primary School
- Holy Cross RC School
- John Betts Primary School
- Kenmont Primary School
- Langford Primary School
- Larmenier & Sacred Heart RC Primary School
- London Oratory School
- Melcombe Primary School
- Miles Coverdale Primary School
- Normand Croft Community School
- Old Oak Primary School
- Queen's Manor School
- St Augustine's RC Primary School
- St John XXIII RC Primary School
- St John's Walham Green CE Primary School
- St Mary's RC Primary School
- St Paul's CE Primary School
- St Peter's Primary School
- St Stephen's School
- St Thomas of Canterbury RC Primary School
- Sir John Lillie Primary School
- Sulivan Primary School
- Thomas's Academy
- Wendell Park Primary School
- West London Free School Primary
- Wormholt Park Primary School

=== Secondary schools ===
- Ark Burlington Danes Academy (CE, mixed)
- The Fulham Boys School (CE, boys)
- Fulham Cross Academy (mixed)
- Fulham Cross Girls' School (girls)
- Hammersmith Academy (mixed)
- The Hurlingham Academy (mixed)
- Lady Margaret School (CE, girls)
- London Oratory School (RC, boys)
- Phoenix Academy (mixed)
- Sacred Heart High School (RC, girls)
- West London Free School (mixed)

=== Special and alternative schools ===
- Cambridge School
- Jack Tizard School
- Ormiston Bridge Academy
- Ormiston Courtyard Academy
- Queensmill School
- Westside School
- Woodlane High School

=== Further education ===
- Ealing, Hammersmith and West London College
- William Morris Sixth Form

== Independent schools ==
=== Primary and preparatory schools ===
- Azbuka Russian-English Bilingual School
- Bute House Preparatory School for Girls
- Ecole Française de Londres Jacques Prévert
- Evergreen Primary School
- Kensington Preparatory School
- L'Ecole des Petits School
- Parsons Green Prep School
- Ravenscourt Park Preparatory School
- St James Junior School
- Sinclair House School
- Thomas's London Day School

=== Senior and all-through schools ===
- ArtsEd (Co-ed, Performing Arts Focus)
- Fulham School (Co-ed)
- Godolphin and Latymer School (Selective, girls)
- Latymer Upper School (Selective, co-ed)
- St James Independent School for Senior Girls (Girls)
- St Paul's Girls' School (Selective, girls)
- Young Dancers Academy (Selective, co-ed)

=== Special and alternative schools ===
- First Bridge School
- The Moat School
- Parayhouse School
- TLG West London
