= Wood Lane tube station (Metropolitan line) =

Former railway station in England

Wood Lane
- Interactive map of Wood Lane

General information
- Location: Shepherd's Bush
- Local authority: Hammersmith & Fulham
- Owner: Metropolitan Railway
- Number of platforms: 2

Key dates
- 1 May 1908: Opened as Wood Lane (Exhibition)
- 31 October 1914: Closed
- 5 November 1920: Reopened on ad hoc basis as Wood Lane (White City)
- 23 November 1947: Renamed White City
- 24 October 1959: Closed
- Replaced by: Wood Lane

Other information
- Coordinates: 51°30′32.37″N 0°13′30.11″W

Wood Lane was a station on the London Underground that was located in Shepherd's Bush, west London. It was opened in 1908 on the Hammersmith branch of the Metropolitan Railway (now the Hammersmith & City line), on the viaduct adjacent to the bridge over Wood Lane and close to a station of the same name but on the Central London Railway (now the Central line).

It was closed temporarily in 1914, reopened in 1920 and eventually closed permanently in 1959 at which time it was served by the Metropolitan line.

== History ==
=== Exhibition station ===
The two Wood Lane stations were opened in 1908 to serve the Franco-British Exhibition and the 1908 Olympic Games in the area that was to become known as White City. The Metropolitan Railway's Wood Lane opened with the name Wood Lane (Exhibition) on 1 May 1908 and the Central London Railway's Wood Lane station opened on 14 May 1908. Both were intended to be temporary and to be closed after the exhibition and the Games. Wood Lane (Exhibition) station was closed on 31 October 1914, shortly after the outbreak of the First World War. The other Wood Lane became the permanent western terminus of the Central London Railway.

Advertising poster by Frederick Charles Herrick for transportation to an exhibition at White City, showing an assemblage of characters representing various advertising trademarks and emblems, including Bibendum, the Michelin Man; Johnnie Walker; and the Kodak Girl, in a station displaying advertising posters

=== Reopening ===
The station was brought back into use on 5 November 1920, with the name Wood Lane (White City), but was open only when an exhibition or event was being staged.

It was served by the Metropolitan line and was between Shepherd's Bush and Latimer Road.

=== Final renaming and subsequent closure ===
The Central line's Wood Lane closed, and was replaced by White City station situated just to the north, on 23 November 1947. The Metropolitan line station changed its name to White City on the same date. It retained this name for the remainder of its existence.

Following a fire in which one of the wooden platforms was destroyed, the Metropolitan line White City station was permanently closed. It was last used on 24 October 1959, and the Television Centre complex now runs on both sides of the railway. The station at viaduct level was largely demolished; the ticket office at ground level remains and has been repainted, though is not visible from the street.

The entrance from Wood Lane (and a main entrance to the exhibitions) was situated along a road which no longer exists that ran approximately along the line of the entrance to the Television Centre multi-storey car park. The centre point of the platforms was approximately opposite the largest of the BBC satellite dishes to the west of the line.

Diagram of stations in the Shepherd's Bush area showing the location of Wood Lane (White City) station

As part of the plans for the redevelopment of White City, a new Wood Lane station was built on the Hammersmith & City line. Opened on 12 October 2008, it is on the east side of Wood Lane about 100 metres (330 ft) north-east of the former Metropolitan line station.

== Latimer Road and Acton Railway ==
The Latimer Road and Acton Railway (LR&AR), a nominally independent company, proposed a line linking the Hammersmith and City Railway (H&CR) at Wood Lane with the Great Western Railway (GWR) east of their Acton station. The H&CR initially insisted that the LR&AR built a separate exchange station at Wood Lane, rather than using the existing platforms. The GWR wanted the LR&AR to also build a separate Acton station, and a house was demolished at Friar's Place for this.

Latimer Road and Acton Railway Act 1882 (Note: Section 1.)
- Act of Parliament
- Parliament of the United Kingdom
- Long title: An Act for making a Railway in the county of Middlesex to be called the Latimer Road and Acton Railway, and for other purposes.
- Citation: 45 & 46 Vict. c. ccxlvii
- Territorial extent: United Kingdom

Dates
- Royal assent: 18 August 1882
- Commencement: 18 August 1882 (Note: The Acts of Parliament (Commencement) Act 1793.)
- Repealed: 30 July 1900

Other legislation
- Repealed by: Latimer Road and Acton Railway Act 1900

Status: Repealed

Text of statute as originally enacted

Latimer Road and Acton Railway Act 1885
- Act of Parliament
- Parliament of the United Kingdom
- Long title: An Act to extend the Powers of the Latimer Road and Acton Railway Company.
- Citation: 48 & 49 Vict. c. lxxviii
- Territorial extent: United Kingdom

Dates
- Royal assent: 16 July 1885
- Commencement: 16 July 1885
- Repealed: 30 July 1900

Other legislation
- Repealed by: Latimer Road and Acton Railway Act 1900

Status: Repealed

Text of statute as originally enacted

Latimer Road and Acton Railway Act 1888
- Act of Parliament
- Parliament of the United Kingdom
- Long title: An Act to extend the powers of the Latimer Road and Acton Railway Company.
- Citation: 51 & 52 Vict. c. cxii
- Territorial extent: United Kingdom

Dates
- Royal assent: 24 July 1888
- Commencement: 24 July 1888
- Repealed: 30 July 1900

Other legislation
- Repealed by: Latimer Road and Acton Railway Act 1900

Status: Repealed

Text of statute as originally enacted

Latimer Road and Acton Railway Act 1891
- Act of Parliament
- Parliament of the United Kingdom
- Long title: An Act to extend the time for the compulsory purchase of lands for and for the completion of the Latimer Road and Acton Railway.
- Citation: 54 & 55 Vict. c. lxxii
- Territorial extent: United Kingdom

Dates
- Royal assent: 3 July 1891
- Commencement: 3 July 1891
- Repealed: 30 July 1900

Other legislation
- Repealed by: Latimer Road and Acton Railway Act 1900

Status: Repealed

Text of statute as originally enacted

Latimer Road and Acton Railway Act 1893
- Act of Parliament
- Parliament of the United Kingdom
- Long title: An Act to extend the time for the compulsory purchase of Lands for and for the completion of the Latimer Road and Acton Railway.
- Citation: 56 & 57 Vict. c. clxvii
- Territorial extent: United Kingdom

Dates
- Royal assent: 27 July 1893
- Commencement: 27 July 1893
- Repealed: 30 July 1900

Other legislation
- Repealed by: Latimer Road and Acton Railway Act 1900

Status: Repealed

Text of statute as originally enacted

Latimer Road and Acton Railway Act 1895
- Act of Parliament
- Parliament of the United Kingdom
- Long title: An Act to extend the time for the compulsory purchase of lands for and for the completion of the Latimer Road and Acton Railway and for other purposes.
- Citation: 58 & 59 Vict. c. cl
- Territorial extent: United Kingdom

Dates
- Royal assent: 6 July 1895
- Commencement: 6 July 1895
- Repealed: 30 July 1900

Other legislation
- Repealed by: Latimer Road and Acton Railway Act 1900

Status: Repealed

Text of statute as originally enacted

The railway was authorised by the Latimer Road and Acton Railway Act 1882 (45 & 46 Vict. c. ccxlvii), but between 1885 and 1893 four acts of Parliament for extensions of time – Latimer Road and Acton Railway Act 1885 (48 & 49 Vict. c. lxxviii), the Latimer Road and Acton Railway Act 1888 (51 & 52 Vict. c. cxii), the Latimer Road and Acton Railway Act 1891 (54 & 55 Vict. c. lxxii), and the Latimer Road and Acton Railway Act 1893 (56 & 57 Vict. c. clxvii) – were needed, as the Latimer Road and Acton Railway Company could not reach agreement with the Great Western and the Metropolitan for joint-working of the line. When this was finally achieved, and confirmed by the Latimer Road and Acton Railway Act 1895 (58 & 59 Vict. c. cl), capital could not be raised.

Latimer Road and Acton Railway Act 1900
- Act of Parliament
- Parliament of the United Kingdom
- Long title: An Act for the abandonment of the Latimer Road and Acton Railway.
- Citation: 63 & 64 Vict. c. xcv
- Territorial extent: United Kingdom

Dates
- Royal assent: 30 July 1900
- Commencement: 30 July 1900
- Repealed: 31 January 2013

Other legislation
- Repeals/revokes: Latimer Road and Acton Railway Act 1882; Latimer Road and Acton Railway Act 1885; Latimer Road and Acton Railway Act 1888; Latimer Road and Acton Railway Act 1891; Latimer Road and Acton Railway Act 1893; Latimer Road and Acton Railway Act 1895
- Repealed by: Statute Law (Repeals) Act 2013

Status: Repealed

The line was abandoned by the Latimer Road and Acton Railway Act 1900 (63 & 64 Vict. c. xcv), after only small parts had been built, including an iron bridge (later demolished) over the North and South Western Junction Railway near the current Westway road bridge. The later Ealing and Shepherd's Bush Railway followed a similar route to the proposed LR&AR line, the Metropolitan ironically promoting a bill in 1912 to connect the Hammersmith & City to this line, which failed on opposition from the Great Western, the Central London Railway, and the District Railway.

== Media ==
The station was one of the filming locations featured in the first episode of the 1964 Doctor Who serial “The Dalek Invasion of Earth”, its undergrowth-filled appearance underscoring the episode's concept of a seemingly abandoned future London.

== Notes ==
Preceding station	London Underground	Following station
Shepherd's Bush towards Hammersmith	Metropolitan line Hammersmith branch	Latimer Road towards Barking
