= William Morris Sixth Form =

Location
- St Dunstan's Road; Hammersmith, London, W6 8RB; England; 51°29′23″N 0°13′09″W

Information
- Type: Community sixth form
- Motto: Inclusive Excellence
- Established: 1994
- Local authority: Hammersmith and Fulham
- Department for Education URN: 133545 Tables
- Ofsted: Reports
- Principal: Mary Berrisford
- Gender: Mixed
- Age: 16 to 19
- Enrolment: 856
- Website: www.wmsf.ac.uk//

William Morris Sixth Form (WMSF) is a mixed community sixth form, located in the Hammersmith area of the London Borough of Hammersmith and Fulham, England. It is named after William Morris, the textile designer, artist, writer, and libertarian socialist associated with the Pre-Raphaelite Brotherhood and British Arts and Crafts Movement.

WMSF was first established in 1994 as the country's first 16-19 school. It offers sixth form education to students from over 100 schools across London, however priority is given to local students from Fulham College Boys’ School, Fulham Cross Girls School, Fulham Enterprise Studio and Hurlingham and Chelsea Secondary School and Woodlane High School

WMSF offers students a range of over 35 courses as programmes of study. Courses include A Levels, GCSEs, IGCSEs, BTECs and foundation learning courses.
