= Wood Lane =

Street in London

Coordinates: 51.5105°N 0.2246°W

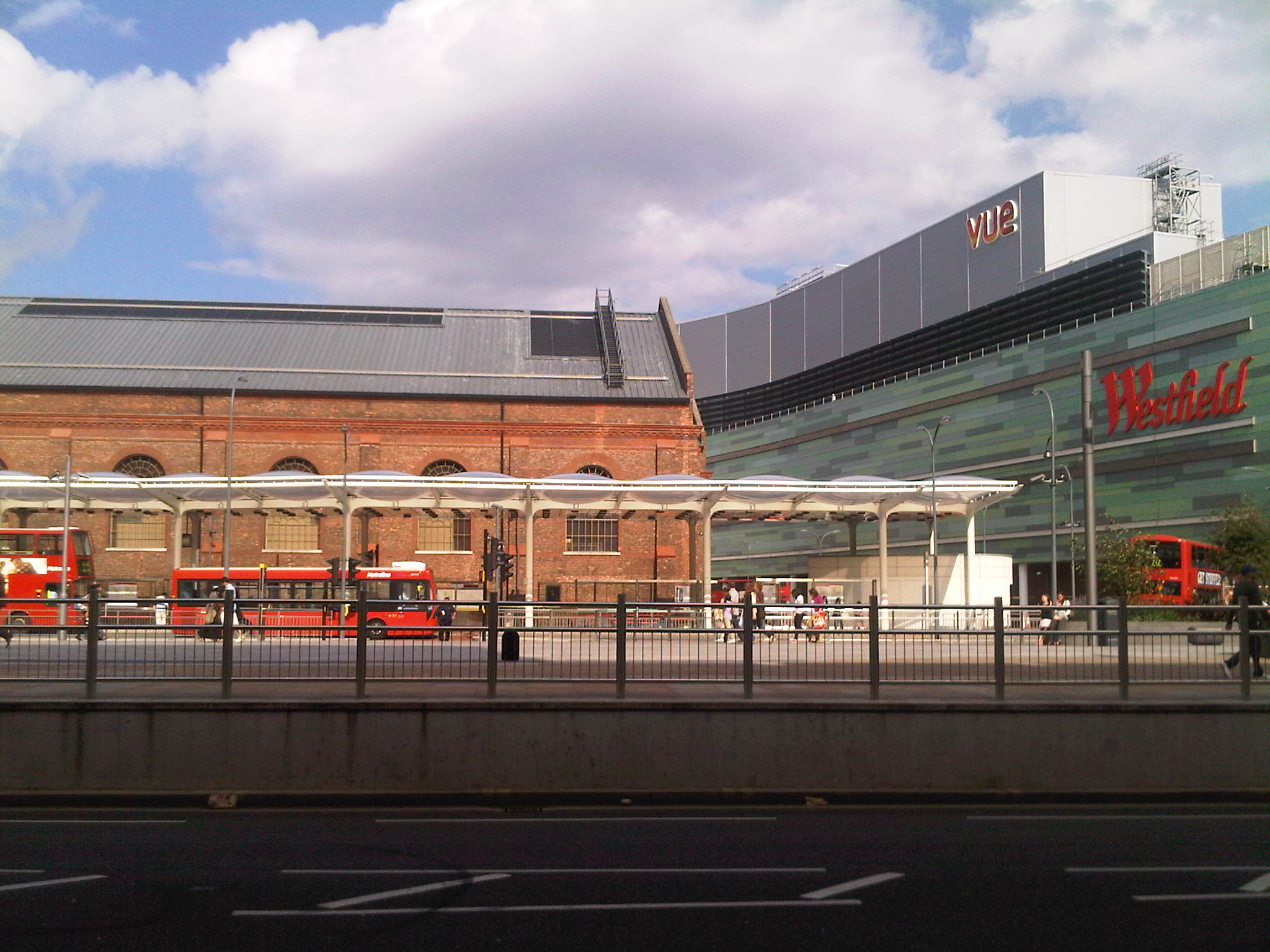
Wood Lane, London

Wood Lane (A219; formerly A40) is a street in London. It runs north from Shepherd's Bush, under the Westway (A40) past Wormwood Scrubs where it meets Scrubs Lane. The road is wholly in the London Borough of Hammersmith and Fulham (W12 postal district). It is probably best known as the home of the BBC Television Centre, also BBC White City and formerly BBC Woodlands the offices of BBC Worldwide.

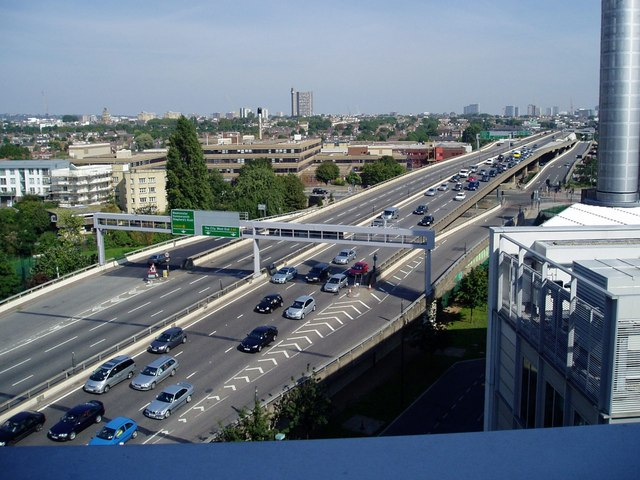
Westway flyover junction at Ladbroke Grove, looking east. The Westway goes over Wood Lane.

== History ==
In the 1780s, the road was known as Turvens Lane after Turvens House located a short distance north of Shepherd's Bush Green. By the 1830s it had received its current name. In the 1860s the railway arrived with a line running parallel with Wood Lane but the area was still rural in character with the buildings of Wood Lane Farm, Eynam Farm and Hoof's Farm to the east of the road and a plant nursery to the west covering the land east of present-day Frithville Gardens and south of the BBC Television centre. Even into the 20th century the land either side of Wood Lane remained undeveloped until the area was chosen for the site of the 1908 Franco-British exhibition and 1908 Summer Olympics.

The area to the west of Wood Lane, north of Loftus Road stadium, south of Du Cane Road and east of Bloemfontein Road was laid out as the exhibition site. The numerous pavilions faced with white stone earned the exhibition the nickname "the White City" which subsequently remained with the area, even after the exhibition closed and its pavilions were demolished.

White City Stadium built to host the Olympics was located on the site of BBC White City.

=== Wood Lane Underground stations ===
The Central London Railway (CLR, now the Central line) opened Wood Lane station in 1908 on the north side of its Wood Lane depot to serve the exhibition. Originally intended to be a temporary service it survived until 1947 when it was replaced by White City station a short distance to the north.

The Metropolitan Railway also opened a station on its line between Paddington and Hammersmith (now the Hammersmith & City line). The station, also called Wood Lane although separate from the CLR's station, was adjacent to the railway bridge over Wood Lane. This station survived until it was destroyed by fire in 1959.

To serve the new White City shopping centre development, a new station on the Hammersmith & City line, also called Wood Lane opened on 12 October 2008 to the east of Wood Lane.
