= West London Lifelong Learning Network =

The West London Lifelong Learning Network is a government funded partnership.

It aims to increase the number of vocational learners progressing to and through Higher Education using flexible learning, and respond to employers’ skills shortages.

The West London Lifelong Learning Network is committed to joint working with its academic partners and employers to help achieve its goals.

== Focus ==
Its activities centre around three West London priority areas:

- Health & Social Care
- Heathrow (travel and tourism, hospitality and catering, retail, logistics, aeronautical engineering, environmental sustainability, business and IT services)
- Science, Technology, Engineering & Mathematics.

== Partners ==
The West London Lifelong Learning Network's academic partners are:

- Brunel University
- Capel Manor College
- College of North West London
- Ealing, Hammersmith and West London College
- Harrow College
- Kingston University
- Royal Holloway, University of London
- St Dominic's Sixth Form College
- Stanmore College
- Thames Valley University
- Uxbridge College
- West Thames College
- University of Westminster
- William Morris Sixth Form

== See also ==
- Higher Education Funding Council for England
- Lifelong Learning Networks (LLNs)
