= Queensmill =

Queensmill may refer to:

- Queensmill School, in London
- A neighborhood in Midlothian, Virginia
