= Latimer Road tube station =

London Underground station

Latimer Road
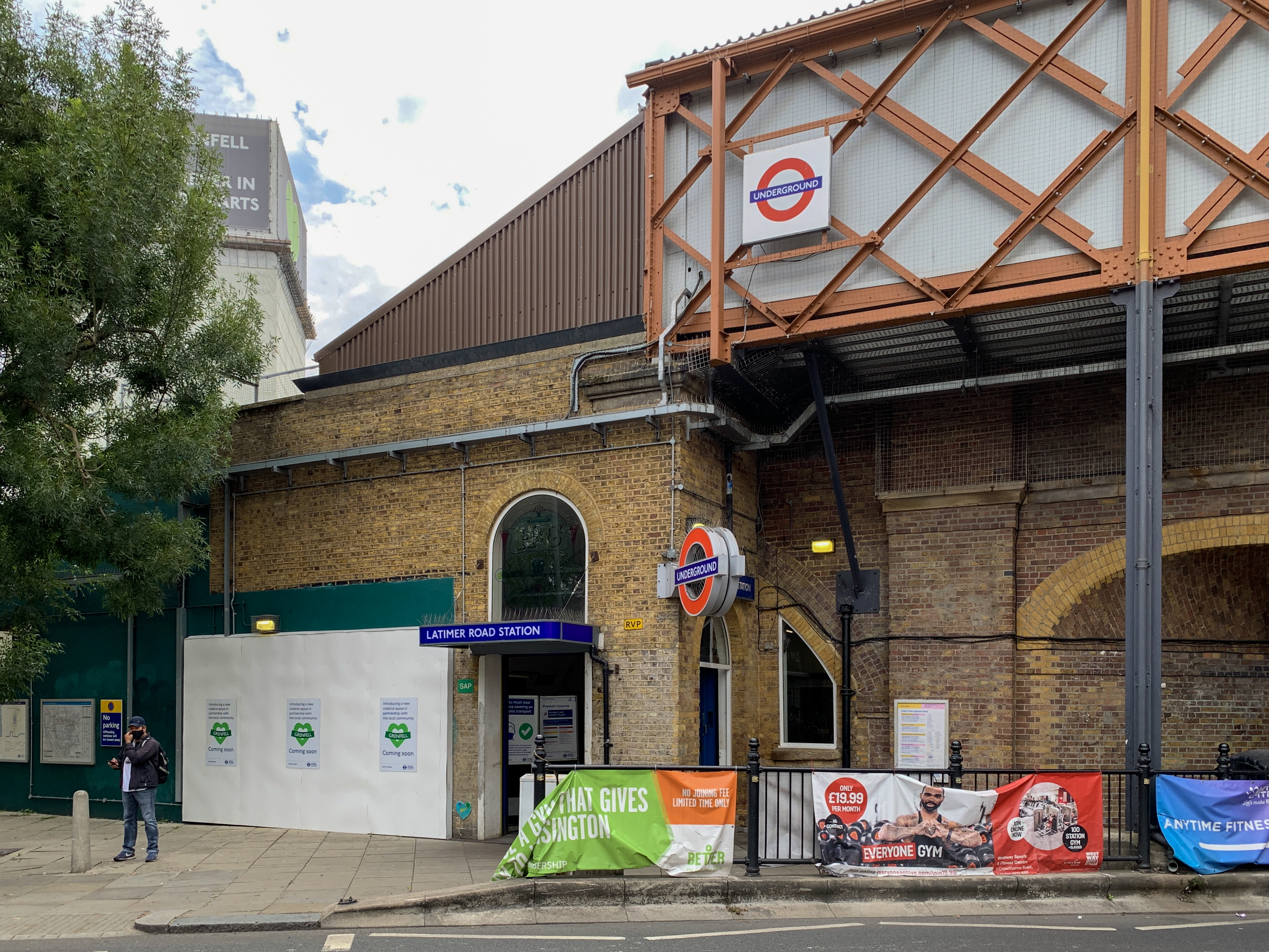
- Station entrance
- Interactive map of Latimer Road

General information
- Location: North Kensington
- Local authority: Kensington and Chelsea
- Managed by: London Underground
- Number of platforms: 2
- Fare zone: 2

London Underground annual entry and exit
- 2020: ▼1.12 million
- 2021: ▼1.08 million
- 2022: ▲1.84 million
- 2023: ▲1.95 million
- 2024: ▲2.15 million

Key dates
- 16 December 1868: Opened (MR)
- 30 July 1990: Service transferred to H&C
- 13 December 2009: Started (Circle line)

Other information
- External links: TfL station info page
- Coordinates: 51.514°N 0.217°W

Latimer Road (/ˈlætɪmər ˈroʊd/) is a London Underground station in North Kensington, in the Royal Borough of Kensington and Chelsea. It is on the Circle and Hammersmith & City lines, between Wood Lane and Ladbroke Grove stations. It is in London fare zone 2.

== Location ==
Unusually, Latimer Road and the station that bears its name are not geographically close, being approximately 500 metres apart and on opposite sides of the Westway Flyover (A40 road) – the road being to the north and the station to the south. Prior to the construction of the Westway and the elevated roundabout that joins it to the West Cross Route (A3220), Latimer Road ran further south and closer to the station. The construction of the elevated road required the demolition of the central section of Latimer Road and the truncated and isolated southern end of the road was renamed as part of Freston Road. Despite the renaming of the southern part of the road, the station retained its original name. The road was named after Edward Latymer, who bequeathed the land to build the road in order to help fund the school in Hammersmith that he founded, Latymer Upper School. Freston is the name of the ancestral village in Suffolk of the Latymer family.

== History ==
Map of stations in Shepherd's Bush area showing Latimer Road and the closed connection to Uxbridge Road station

The station opened on 16 December 1868 at a junction formed between two existing railway lines – the Hammersmith & City Railway (owned by the Great Western Railway and running between Westbourne Park and Hammersmith stations) and the West London Railway (WLR) (between Willesden Junction and Addison Road (now Kensington (Olympia)) stations). Services to Addison Road were originally provided via the junction to the WLR tracks but these were discontinued in 1940 and the junction no longer exists. The line between Latimer Road and Uxbridge Road was then closed and the raised train track demolished. The remains of that stretch of track can be seen from the west end of the eastbound platform, which now houses a secure Relay Room.

In July 2010, the westbound platform 2 was closed to begin refurbishment and extension work, in preparation for the new S Stock, to be introduced on the Circle and Hammersmith & City lines from 2012, which consists of 7 cars instead of the current 6-car configuration. Volker Rail has been contracted by TfL to demolish and rebuild both the east- and westbound platforms, starting with the westbound platform and then moving over to the eastbound. Reportedly it had been paid 7 million pounds to carry out the work laid out in the original plans. However the plans changed due to the poor conditions of the arches underneath the platforms, the poor condition of the lattice girders on the bridge over Bramley Road, and subsidence at ground level in the ticket hall.

The station closed completely on Monday 17 January 2011 for 14 weeks. The westbound platform re-opened first, and the eastbound platform's re-opening on Monday 1 August 2011 heralded the station's full return to service. A new station entrance is to be built next to the disused kiosk after underpinning work has been carried out to the station's green painted wall facing Bramley Road.

From 5 October 2014 to 3 November the same year, eastbound trains did not stop at the station to allow for refurbishment work on the staircase between the ticket hall and the eastbound platform.

== The station today ==
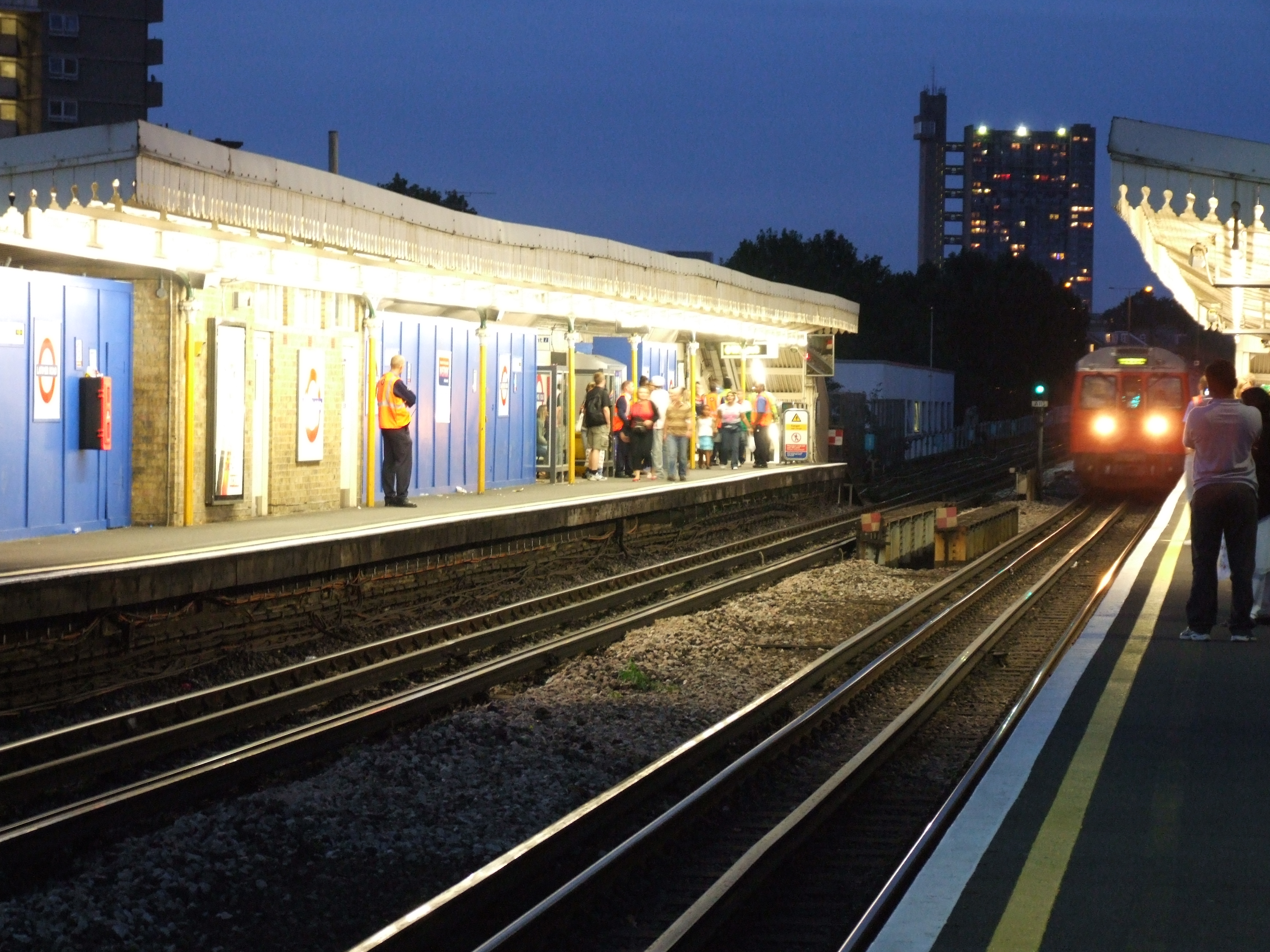
Latimer Road Tube Station with Trellick Tower in the background.

=== Design ===
The station ticket hall at Latimer Road is located at ground level within the arches of the viaduct carrying the tracks above. The platforms are accessed by stairs and retain much of their original character with simple open timber canopies.

=== Station facilities ===
The station has a ticket hall and 2 passenger-operated machines (or POMs). The larger POM, called a Multi Fare Machine (MFM) accepts UK Sterling notes, up to £20 and gives change of 10p, 50p, £1 and £2 coins. The smaller machine, known as an Advance Fare Machine (AFM), does not give change and accepts overpayment up to 30p. Both machines accept most major credit and debit cards; however, to help combat fraud, individual cards can only be used once a day. These machines are the standard London Underground installation at all LU operated stations.

The station also has Electric Service Update Boards or ESUBS. These large screens advertise service information which is updated from the Network Operations Centre, located at London Underground's head office above St James's Park tube station.

There are 5 Customer Help Points on the station, 1 in the ticket hall at ground level and 2 on each platform. These communication devices are connected to the Station Control Room at Ladbroke Grove station. They are mostly used by customers to find out where or when their next train is due, but can be used to contact staff or the police in an emergency. There are also 3 payphones at the station and waiting room on the platforms.

The station kiosk has been closed for many years. It is now used by London Underground as a storage area.

=== Proximity to Grenfell Tower ===
Grenfell Tower, which was destroyed in a fire on 14 June 2017, killing 72 people, stands behind the station, and there is a clear view of the tower from the Paddington-bound platform. Automated announcements asking passengers waiting for trains not to take photos of the fire-damaged building are made by Transport for London, mainly as a mark of respect to those who died or were otherwise affected by the disaster, but also so that any flashes from smartphones or cameras do not distract train drivers looking at signals en route. The UK government has requested that the station be renamed as a tribute to Grenfell Tower, a process that will need to be explored by Transport for London.

== Connections ==
London Bus routes 295 and 316 serve the station.

Preceding station	London Underground	Following station
Wood Lane towards Hammersmith	Circle line	Ladbroke Grove towards Edgware Road via Aldgate
Wood Lane towards Hammersmith	Hammersmith & City line	Ladbroke Grove towards Barking
Former services
Shepherd's Bush towards Hammersmith	Metropolitan line Hammersmith branch (1864-1908)	Ladbroke Grove towards Paddington
Wood Lane towards Hammersmith	Metropolitan line Hammersmith branch (1908-1914)	Ladbroke Grove towards Paddington
Shepherd's Bush towards Hammersmith	Metropolitan line Hammersmith branch (1914-1920)	Ladbroke Grove towards Paddington
Wood Lane towards Hammersmith	Metropolitan line Hammersmith branch (1920-1959)	Ladbroke Grove towards Paddington
Shepherd's Bush towards Hammersmith	Metropolitan line Hammersmith branch (1959-1990)	Ladbroke Grove towards Paddington
Disused railways
Preceding station	London Underground	Following station
Uxbridge Road towards Kensington (Addison Road)	Metropolitan line Addison Road branch (1864-1940)	Ladbroke Grove towards Paddington
