= Fulham Enterprise Studio =

Coordinates: 51.4814°N 0.2132°W

Location
- Kingwood Road; Fulham, London, SW6 6SN; England

Information
- Type: Studio school
- Established: 2012
- Closed: 2020
- Gender: Coeducational
- Age: 14 to 19
- Website: http://www.fulhamenterprise.net/

Fulham Enterprise Studio was a studio school within a school at Fulham College Boys' School and based in the adjacent former Kingwood CLC building in London, England.

== History ==
The first Studio School to open in Inner London, it offered a new and different style of mainstream education. It was formally opened by the Duke of York in December 2012.

At age 14, Fulham Enterprise Studio accepted into Year 10 girls and boys of all abilities from either Fulham College Boys' School or Fulham Cross Girls School. The sixth form accepted applications from young people attending any school, with priority given to students attending Fulham College Boys’ School and Fulham Cross Girls’ School.

Fulham Enterprise Studio shared some facilities with Fulham College Boys' School including specialist science and design and technology blocks, a multi-use Astroturf sports pitch and gym on site and a fully equipped performing arts centre.

Fulham Enterprise Studio gave students the opportunity to study the core National Curriculum alongside project based learning and work placements, leading to GCSEs, BTECS; and NVQs, AS and A levels (Sixth Form only).

As of September 2020 Fulham Enterprise Studio no longer operates as a separate institution. Instead the building is now used as the general sixth form provision for Fulham Cross Academy, the new name for Fulham College Boys' School.
