= Imperial International Exhibition =

World's fair in London

1909 London

Overview
- BIE-class: Unrecognized exposition
- Name: Imperial International Exhibition

Participant(s)
- Countries: 9

Location
- Country: United Kingdom of Great Britain and Ireland
- City: London
- Venue: White City
- Coordinates: 51.5126°N 0.2275°W

Timeline
- Opening: 20 May 1909
- Closure: October 1909

The Imperial International Exhibition was a world's fair held in White City, London in 1909. The exhibition was opened by the Duke of Argyll on 20 May 1909 and continued for five months before closing in October.

This was the second of five exhibitions to be held at London's White City (following the Franco-British Exhibition and preceding the Japan–British Exhibition) and retained many of the 1908 exhibitions but on larger grounds and with additional amusements including an alpine railway.

This gave the opportunity to reflect on the achievements of the three members of the recently agreed Triple Entente. As part of this France displayed a Dahomey (now Benin) village; and Russia a Kalmuk camp.

Austria, China, Denmark, Italy, the Netherlands and Persia also participated.

== See also ==
- Human zoo
