= Wood Lane tube station =

London Underground station

Wood Lane
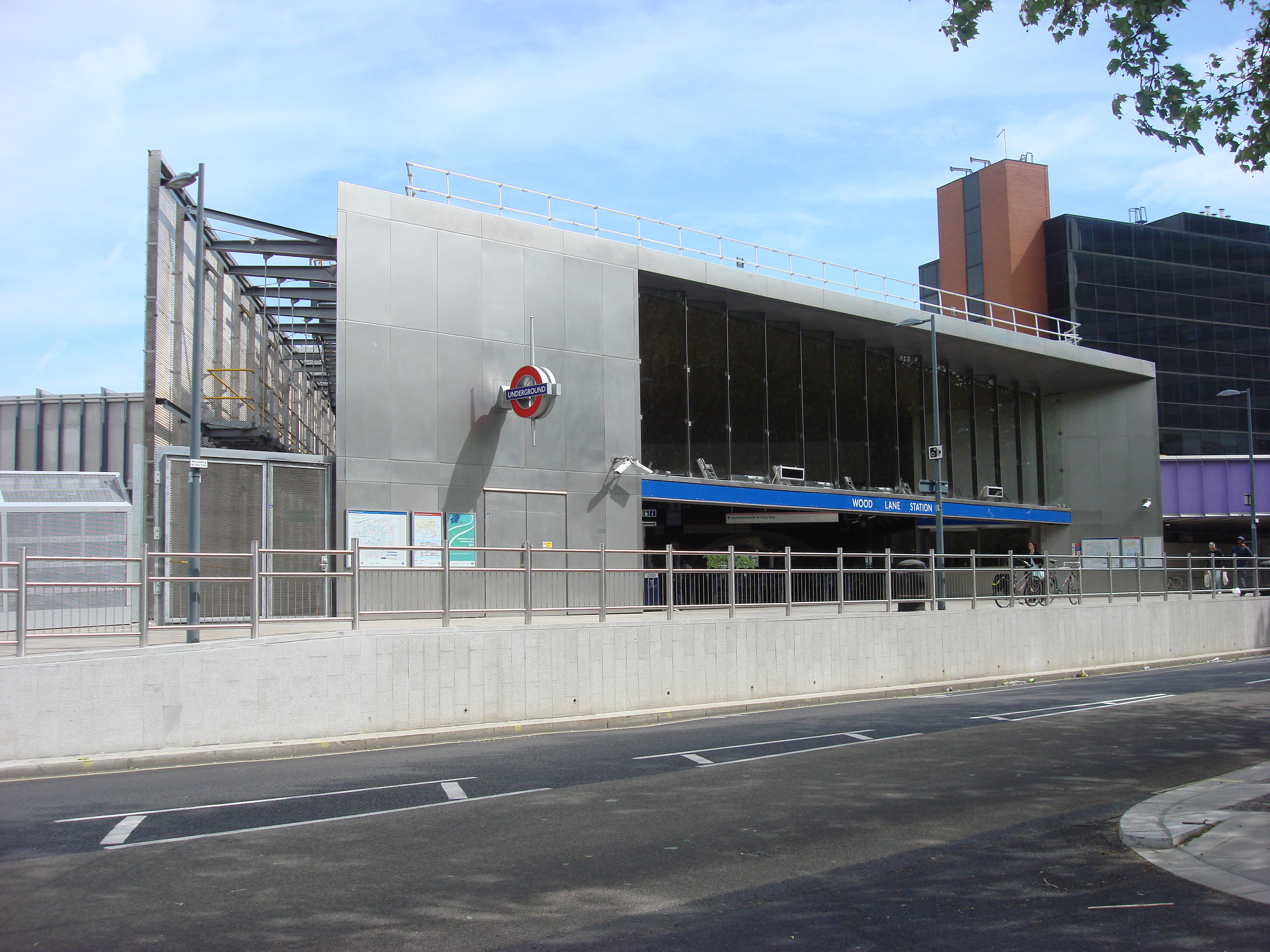
- Wood Lane station
- Interactive map of Wood Lane

General information
- Location: Wood Lane
- Local authority: Hammersmith and Fulham
- Managed by: London Underground
- Number of platforms: 2
- Accessible: Yes
- Fare zone: 2
- OSI: White City

London Underground annual entry and exit
- 2020: ▼1.36 million
- 2021: ▲2.19 million
- 2022: ▲4.13 million
- 2023: ▲4.91 million
- 2024: ▲4.98 million

Railway companies
- Original company: Transport for London

Key dates
- 13 June 1864: Line opened
- 12 October 2008: Station opened
- 13 December 2009: Circle line services started

Other information
- External links: TfL station info page
- Coordinates: 51.5097972°N 0.22417°W

Wood Lane is a London Underground station in the White City area of west London, United Kingdom. It is on the Circle and Hammersmith & City lines, between Shepherd's Bush Market and Latimer Road stations, and is located in London fare zone 2. Although it is on a line which has been in operation since 1864, the station is new, having opened on 12 October 2008 – the first station to be built on an existing Tube line for over 70 years. It is near the site of a station of the same name that closed on 24 October 1959.

== History ==
Stations old and new in the Shepherd's Bush area

The Hammersmith and City line was opened on 13 June 1864 by the Metropolitan Railway (MR) as the Hammersmith branch line. The railway became part of London Underground in 1933 and took on a separate identity as the Hammersmith and City line in 1990.

In 1908 the Franco-British Exhibition and the 1908 Summer Olympics came to London, the first of a number of major events in White City that attracted infrastructural investment by railway companies. Among others, the MR opened its Wood Lane station on the Hammersmith branch to serve the event. From 1927 it was used to transport the public to and from the greyhound racing at White City Stadium. The station opened and closed intermittently, and was renamed twice, to Wood Lane (White City) in 1920 and White City in 1947, before it closed on 24 October 1959 following fire damage. For the next 49 years, the Wood Lane area was served only by White City on the Central line; Hammersmith line trains passed through the area without stopping, the nearest station on that line approximately 1 km (0.62 mi) away at Shepherd's Bush.

In the early 1970s, rebuilding a station on the site was considered as part of the plans for the new White City Channel Tunnel terminal located adjacent, however the plans were abandoned in January 1975.

In 2005, work commenced on the large-scale Westfield Shopping Centre. As part of the work, £200m of transport improvements were made including rebuilding Shepherd's Bush Central line station, a new Shepherd's Bush railway station and two bus interchanges. It was decided to build a new station on the Hammersmith & City line, just north-east of the old Metropolitan station on Wood Lane. In 2006 Transport for London decided, after deliberating over various possibilities, on the name Wood Lane, reviving an historical name. This was the first time that a new station on the Tube had been given the name of a former station that had been closed for several years. The station opened on 12 October 2008, and for its first year, was served exclusively by the Hammersmith & City line. On 13 December 2009 Wood Lane was added to the Circle line when the line was extended to Hammersmith.

== Design and construction ==
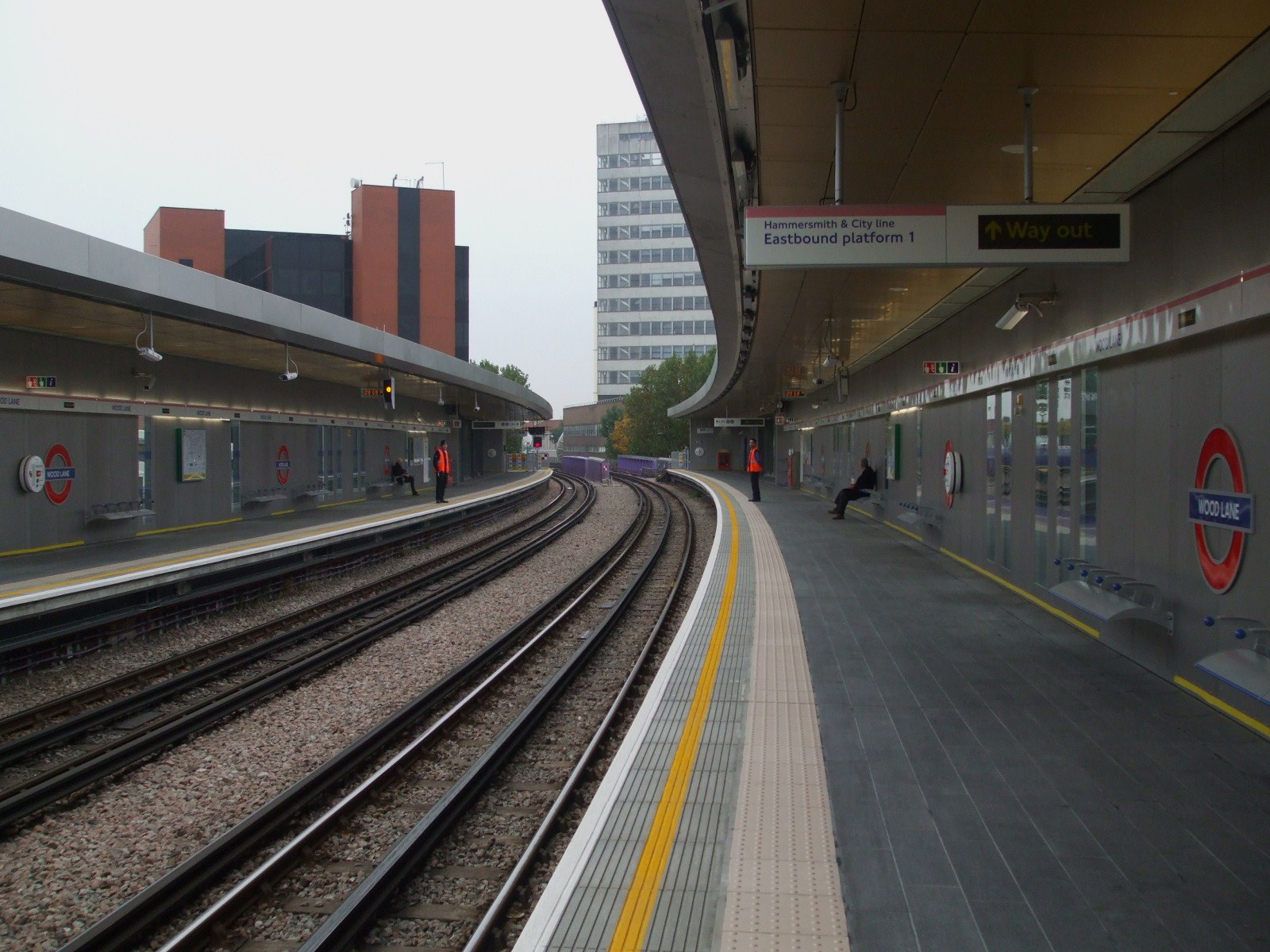
Wood Lane tube station eastbound platform looking west

Wood Lane Underground Station was designed by Ian Ritchie Architects and it is clad in shot-peened stainless steel, gold anodised aluminium and granite with a 25-metre-high glass screen façade. Construction was carried out by Costain. The station building occupies an irregularly-shaped site between Wood Lane and the railway viaduct, and presented particular challenges as it lies across the Central line. The lines remained operational during construction, which mostly took place at night.

The structure encases the railway viaduct and platforms are accessed via stairs and lifts either side of the brick arches. During construction the bridge of the Hammersmith & City line over Wood Lane had to be widened to accommodate a new track on the Central line, providing access to the new depot below the Westfield site. A bridge pier was removed and a new steel bridge structure slid into place over a new pier. As with all new Underground stations since the 1990s, the station is fully accessible.

== Location ==
The station is on Wood Lane, which runs north from Shepherd's Bush in the White City area. It serves the Westfield shopping centre and Television Centre (formerly occupied by the BBC) and Loftus Road stadium, the home of Queen's Park Rangers FC, is a short distance away.

== See also ==
- Shepherd's Bush stations – other stations in the Shepherd's Bush area.
- Wood Lane – a closed station on the Central line
- Wood Lane – a closed station on the Metropolitan line

Preceding station	London Underground	Following station
Shepherd's Bush Market towards Hammersmith	Circle line	Latimer Road towards Edgware Road via Aldgate
Shepherd's Bush Market towards Hammersmith	Hammersmith & City line	Latimer Road towards Barking
