= Ark Burlington Danes Academy =

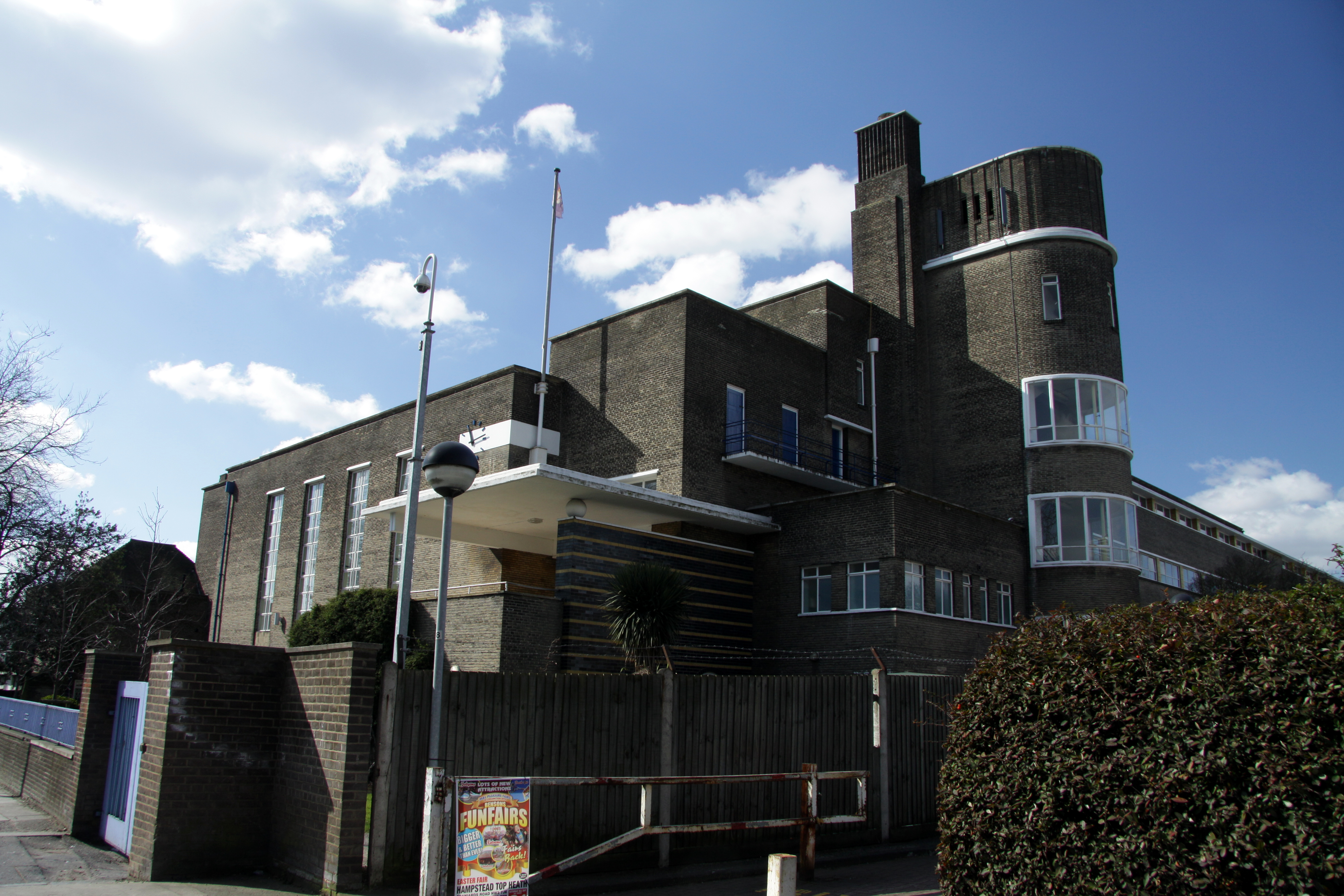

Location
- Du Cane Road; London, W12 0TN; England
- 51.518681°N 0.229495°W

Information
- Type: Academy
- Religious affiliation: Church of England
- Established: 1699
- Local authority: Hammersmith and Fulham
- Trust: Ark Academies
- Department for Education URN: 131752 Tables
- Ofsted: Reports
- Chair: Paul Simon
- Principal: David Carr
- Gender: Mixed
- Age: 3 to 18
- Enrolment: 1,249
- Houses: Galatians, Philippians, Corinthians, Romans, Colossians, Ephesians and Titus
- Website: www.burlingtondanes.org

Ark Burlington Danes Academy is a Church of England, non-selective, mixed all-through school located in White City, London on a 10-acre (40,000 m^{2}) site.

The school is funded by the Department for Education and operated by Ark Schools, a registered charity under English law, and sponsored by parent charity Ark.

== History ==
Ark Burlington Danes Academy traces its origins to two separate schools, St Clement Danes Grammar School for boys, founded in 1562 and Burlington Church of England School for Girls founded in 1699, both originally situated in Westminster. Following a decision by the trustees of the St Clement Danes Holborn Estate Charity, St Clement Danes Grammar School relocated from Ducane Road, Hammersmith to Chorleywood, Hertfordshire, and a new school, Burlington Danes a Church of England School, was formed on its old site in 1976.

Ark Burlington Danes Academy became an all-through school in September 2015 with the opening of a primary school. In 2017, in the immediate aftermath of the Grenfell Tower fire, the school provided accommodation to students from the Kensington Aldridge Academy who had been traumatised and displaced.

== Buildings ==
The school has one of the largest school sites in central London. The 10 acre grounds include a multipurpose theatre and performing arts centre, the Dennis Potter Building, named after the playwright who was an alumnus of St Clement Danes. The school consists of a large listed brick building attached to the main hall of the school. It was designed by architect Frederick MacManus of Burnet, Tait and Lorne in 1936. The other side of the building, constructed later, connects to a technology and art wing, an area for physical education, and a large sports hall.

In 2008, on the opposite side of the grounds, a new building was constructed to house science laboratories, maths and English classes. The site also includes a large field with grass pitches used for rugby, football and cricket. A third generation astroturf football pitch was added in 2010. In 2012 a state of the art gym was fitted in the Stanley Fink building.

== Architects ==
The school was designed by the office of Sir John Burnet, Thomas Tait & Lorne and there is good evidence to show that the Irish born architect Frederick Edward Bradshaw McManus (1903–1985) who had studied modern architecture in France and Holland prior to joining John Burnet & Partners in 1927 and worked on the design of the school prior to its completion in 1936. The architects were working for the school Governor, Ruth Dalton. McManus had already designed and built a modern house at West Leaze, Aldbourne for Dr. and Mrs. Hugh Dalton.

== Notable former pupils ==
- Sharon Blyfield, head of early careers at The Coca-Cola Company
- Wasfi Kani, founder of Pimlico and Grange Park Operas
- D. J. Campbell, Footballer
- Coreé Richards, R&B singer
- Cherise Roberts, singer/songwriter
- Noel Clarke, Actor, writer, producer & director
- Shireen Benjamin, Former Miss West Africa, Model, Journalist/ Fashion & lifestyle blogger
- Simon Mensing, Footballer
- Andy Fraser, bass guitarist with Free and singer
- Dennis Potter, playwright
- Frank Field, MP
- Danny Dichio, Footballer

== See also ==
- List of schools in Hammersmith and Fulham
- Dame Kitty Anderson
