= Kitty Anderson (headmistress) =

British schoolteacher and headmistress

Anderson in March 1950.

Dame Katherine Anderson, DBE (4 July 1903 – 15 July 1979), known as Kitty Anderson, was a British schoolteacher. She was headmistress of the North London Collegiate School from 1945 to 1965.

== Early life and education ==
Katherine Anderson was born on 4 July 1903, Lytham St Annes, Lancashire, the eldest child and only daughter of three children born to John Herbert Anderson, a chartered accountant, and his wife, Lizzie (née Dawson). The family moved to Middlesbrough, where Kitty attended the High School for Girls in Saltburn-by-the-Sea, where she became head girl. She was the first girl from the school to go up to university and attended Royal Holloway College, University of London to read history where she obtained a BA.

In 1925, she obtained a teaching diploma from the London Day Training College, now the Institute of Education and part of the University of London. In 1926, she taught at Craven Street secondary school in Hull. In 1930, she returned to Royal Holloway as a Christie scholar and received a PhD in 1933 in Elizabethan history, 'The treatment of vagrancy and the relief of the poor and destitute in the Tudor period, based upon the local records of London to 1552 and Hull to 1576'.

== Career in education ==
She then taught at Burlington School for Girls, London before taking a position as headmistress of King's Norton Grammar School, Birmingham in 1939. In 1944, she became head of the North London Collegiate School until retirement in 1965.

As headmistress she became a noted figure in the educational world. She was appointed DBE in 1961, and served on the Robbins Committee from 1961–1963. She was a Governor member of the Council of Royal Holloway College from 1947 to 1953, and member again from 1962 until at least 1967. On her retirement she became chairman of the Girls' Public Day School Trust.

She received in 1967 a LLD (University of Hull) and in 1971, a DUniv (University of York).

Esther Rantzen paid tribute to Anderson when she appeared on the BBC's radio programme, Desert Island Discs. Having attended school under Principal Anderson, Rantzen recounted how much of an inspiration Anderson had been as an educator.

== Death ==
Anderson died on 15 July 1979 in Northallerton, Yorkshire.
