= Sharon Blyfield =

British marketing executive and human resources expert

Sharon Blyfield OBE
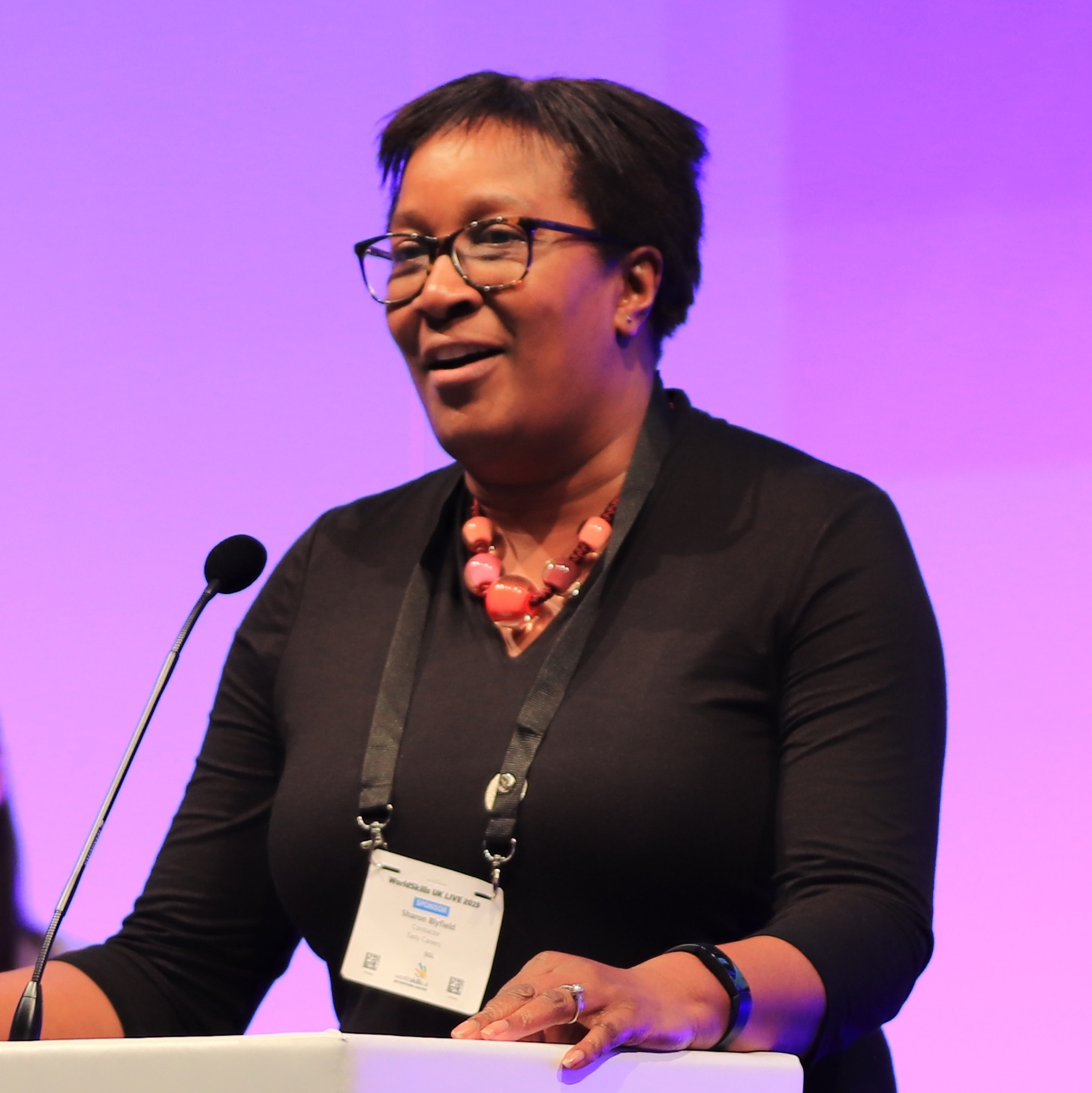
- Blyfield speaking at WorldSkills UK in 2019
- Born: Sharon Marcia Blyfield; December 1966 (age 59)
- Education: Burlington Danes Academy; Hammersmith and West London College
- Employers: The Coca-Cola Company; Cadbury

Sharon Marcia Blyfield OBE is a British marketing executive and human resources expert. She has championed early career development at The Coca-Cola Company. She was appointed an Officer of the Order of the British Empire (OBE) in 2022.

== Early life and education ==
Blyfield is from Shepards Bush, West London. She has two brothers. She attended Burlington Danes Academy a voluntary aided school, and was determined to get a job that would mean her mother did not have to worry about money. She completed a BTEC Extended Diploma in business and finance whilst studying at Hammersmith and West London College. After completing her course, she was offered a job in financial administration.

== Career ==
Blyfield worked in advertising, holding positions at Cadbury and The Coca-Cola Company. At the time, Coca-Cola was expanding into the UK economy, and Blyfield was involved with scaling up their advertising programmes. She eventually shifted to human resources, with a particular focus on the development of early career employees.

Under Blyfield's leadership, Coca-Cola expanded their apprenticeship scheme to include engineering, sales and administration. To improve access to the scheme; she modified the GCSE requirements, and removed the requirement for a CV. She has developed mentorship and training programmes to support apprentices throughout their careers.

Blyfield has campaigned to make apprenticeships more commonplace in the UK. She has also spoken about the need to increase the salaries of apprentices. In 2023, Blyfield was appointed Director of the Board of Youth Employment UK.

=== Awards and honours ===
Blyfield was appointed an Officer of the Order of the British Empire in the 2022 New Year Honours.
