= Westfield London =

Shopping centre in White City, London, England

Coordinates: 51°30′27″N 0°13′16″W

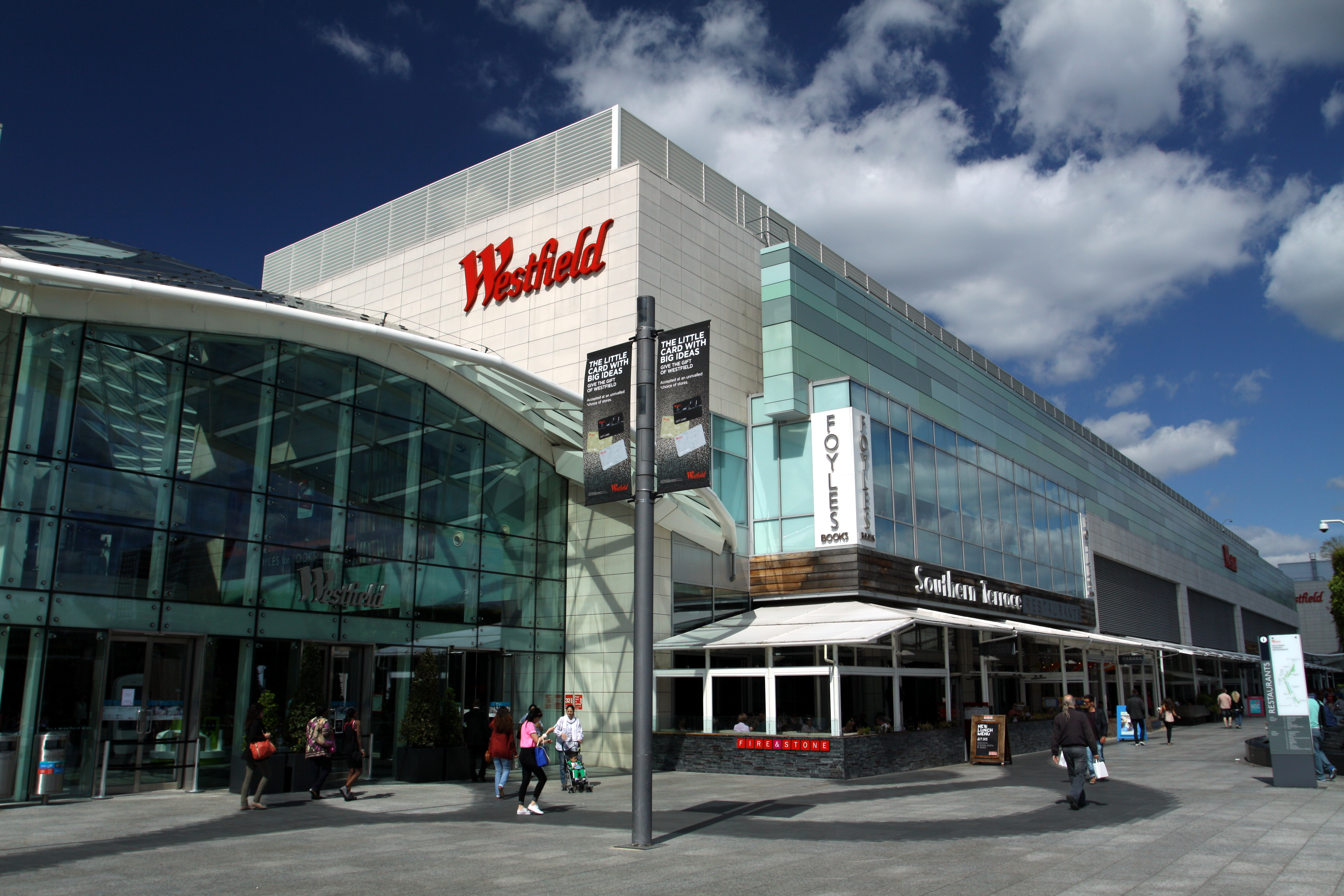
- Location: White City, London, England
- Opened: 30 October 2008; 18 years ago
- Owner: Unibail-Rodamco-Westfield
- Architect: Benoy & Westfield Design Architects, Buchan Group Executive Architects, Ian Ritchie Architects (masterplan), Leonard Design Architects.
- Num. of stores: 301
- Num. of anchor tenants: 4
- Floor area: 2,600,000 sq ft (240,000 m^{2})
- Floors: 5
- Parking: 5,500 spaces
- Public transit: Shepherd's Bush; Shepherd's Bush Market; Wood Lane; White City; Shepherd's Bush
- Website: www.westfield.com/united-kingdom/london

Westfield London, sometimes referred to as Westfield White City, is a large shopping centre in White City, West London, England, developed by the Westfield Group at a cost of £1.6bn, on a brownfield site formerly the home of the 1908 Franco-British Exhibition. The site is bounded by the West Cross Route (A3220), the Westway (A40) and Wood Lane (A219).

It opened on 30 October 2008 and became the largest covered shopping development in the capital; originally a retail floor area of 1,600,000 sq ft (150,000 m^{2}), further investment and expansion led to it becoming both the largest shopping centre in the UK and in Europe by March 2018, an area of 2,600,000 sq ft (240,000 m^{2}).

The centre is anchored by John Lewis, Marks & Spencer, Next and Primark. Former anchor retailers include House of Fraser and Debenhams.

== History ==
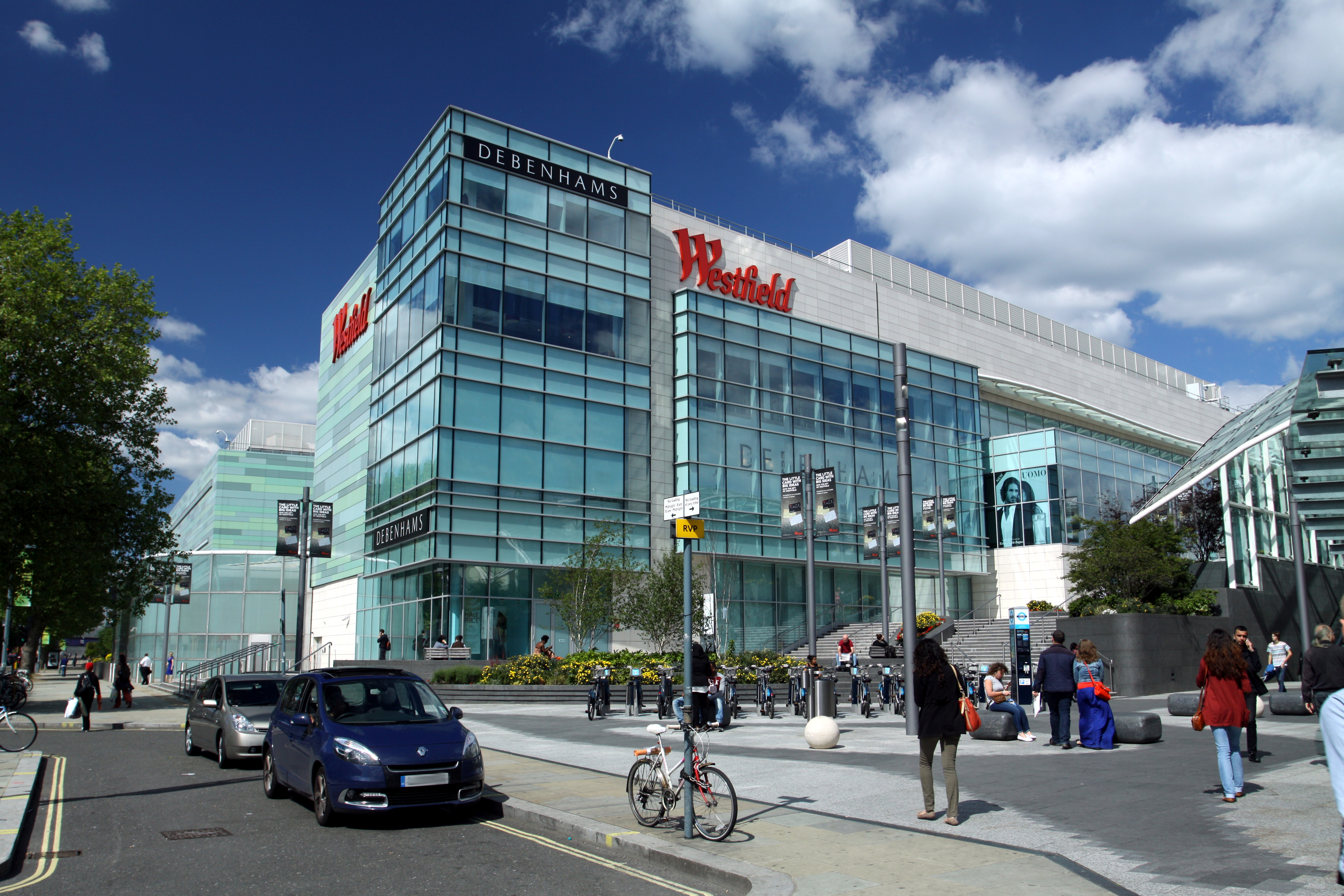
Westfield London from Wood Lane, 2013

=== Background ===
The development is on a large brownfield site, part of which was once the location of the 1908 Franco-British Exhibition. The initial site clearance demolished the set of halls still remaining from the exhibition (their cheap-to-build, white-painted blank facades are said to be the origin of the name White City). There were also considerable precautions needed during demolition due to the expectation of finding unexploded bombs from raids on a local munitions factory during the World War II blitz.

Elsewhere on the site was a London Underground railway depot, which had to be kept fully operational while a new depot was built underground to allow the new shopping centre to be built above both the new depot, and on the old depot site. The old depot was then demolished.

The initial plan for a shopping centre at this location was developed by a consortium, the largest company involved being the UK division of Australian property company Multiplex. However, due to heavy financial losses in other ventures, including the construction of the new Wembley Stadium, Multiplex was forced to sell its stake to the Westfield Group.

The development was built by Westfield Construction, the developer's own construction arm and was delivered on schedule. Robert Bird Group were the structural engineers for the job. The roof was designed by Knippers Helbig Advanced Engineering (Stuttgart, Germany). The project took five years to build, employing 8,000 people. During the site development period, up to 3000 local people received pre-employment training through a partnership scheme aiming to ensure that a significant proportion of the centre's jobs were taken up by local residents. 40% of the centre's management staff had been locally recruited at the time when the centre opened.

On the 7 July 2015, Mohammed Rehman and Sana Ahmed Khan planned to explode a bomb which consisted of 10 kg of urea nitrate inside the shopping centre. The attack was set to occur on the 10 year anniversary of the 7 July 2005 London bombings, but was thwarted by police.

=== 2008–2020: Opening and growth ===
The centre was opened to the public on 30 October 2008 by Frank Lowy, CEO of Westfield Group, in an event also attended by Mayor Boris Johnson, with a retail floor area of 1,600,000 sq ft (150,000 m^{2}). It became the largest covered shopping centre in London having overtaken the Whitgift Centre in Croydon. Amid great hype, two million shoppers visited the centre in its first three weeks, despite the 2008 financial crisis in the UK.

However the 2008 financial crisis did cause a swift fall in shoppers and some shops forcing to close in 2009. While some commentators suspected Westfield London to fail during the economic gloom, the centre reported increased sales in 2010 following an unexpectedly large number of tourist shoppers.

On 16 February 2012, Hammersmith & Fulham Council approved a 700,000 sq ft extension to the north of the existing site. Building work began in 2014, and the extension opened in three phases. The first phase opened in March 2018, and the final phase opened in October 2018. On completion, Westfield London's size increased to 2.6 million square feet (240,000 m^{2}), making it the largest shopping centre in Europe.

The north side of the extension is bounded by a railway viaduct, and the south side of the extension is adjunct to the original shopping centre. The extension replaces an industrial estate which previously occupied the area, divided by Ariel Way. The extension includes 51,000 square metres (550,000 sq ft) of retail space including a 70,000 sq ft Primark store, offices, new streets, public spaces, and approximately 1,522 new homes. The development ranges from four to twelve storeys high with one building of 20 storeys.

The work also includes modifications to Shepherd's Bush railway station, relocation of the White City bus station and reuse of the Dimco Buildings, and pedestrian links on the east side of the site connecting Hammersmith & Fulham with Kensington & Chelsea.

KidZania, a part of the extension, opened in 2015.

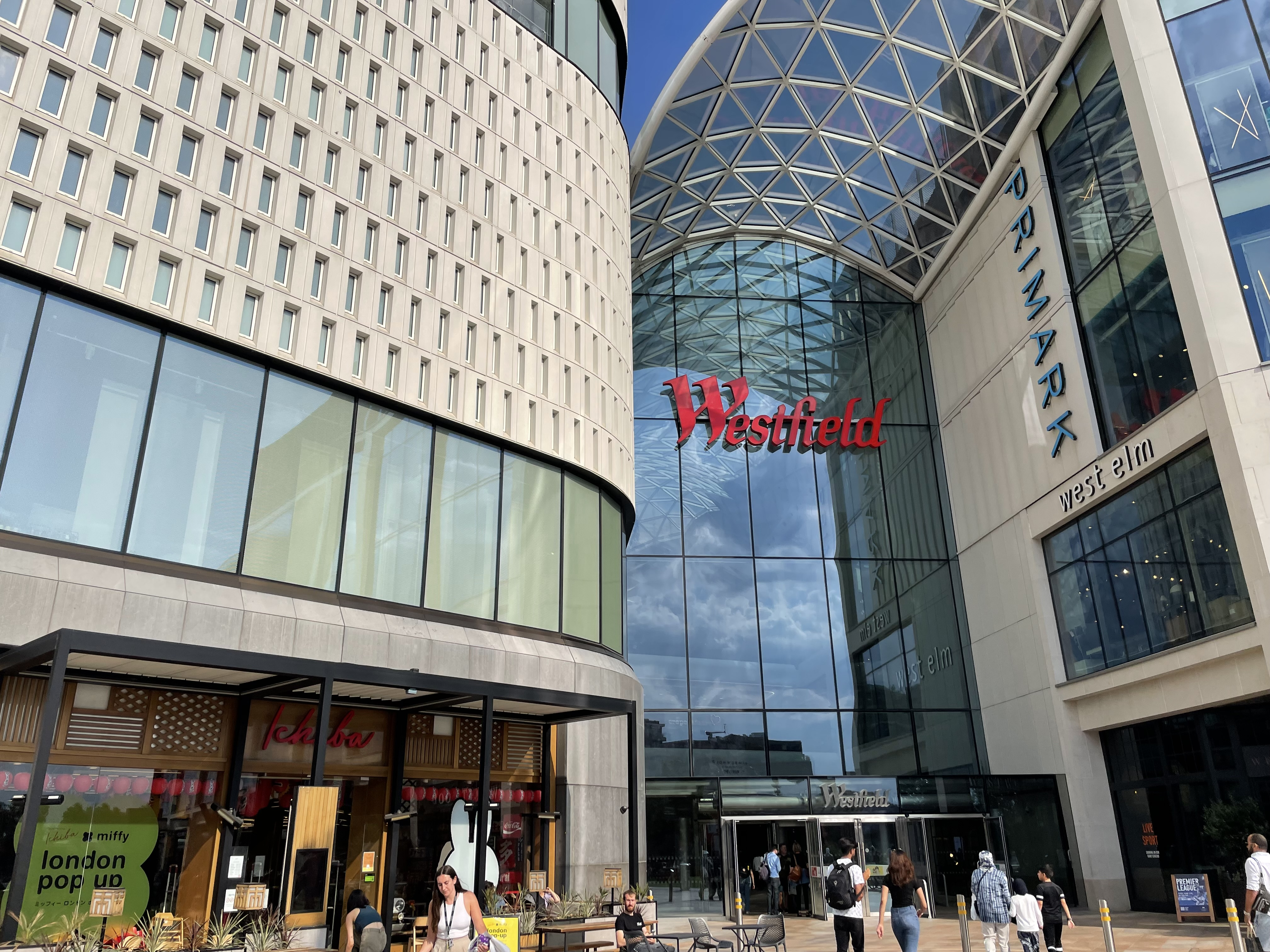
Westfield mall northwest entrance, 2022

The department store John Lewis is the occupant of an 'anchor store' within the extension and opened in March 2018.

=== 2020–present: COVID-19 and changes ===
On 28 April 2020 it was announced that Debenhams' Westfield London store had closed permanently due to the COVID-19 lockdown and entering administration. The former Debenhams space was occupied by a Harrods Outlet for a time.

In January 2023, House of Fraser closed its store in the centre following approval by Hammersmith and Fulham Council of a planning application back in 28 July 2020 on transforming two-thirds of the unit's space into office spaces and two separate retail units that will face the inside of the centre. It was also confirmed in March that TK Maxx would be taking over part of the former Debenhams anchor unit space.

In January 2024, KidZania closed its entertainment centre at the centre, it is set to be replaced by a Wake the Tiger immersive experience in 2026.

== Stores and entertainment ==
=== Stores ===
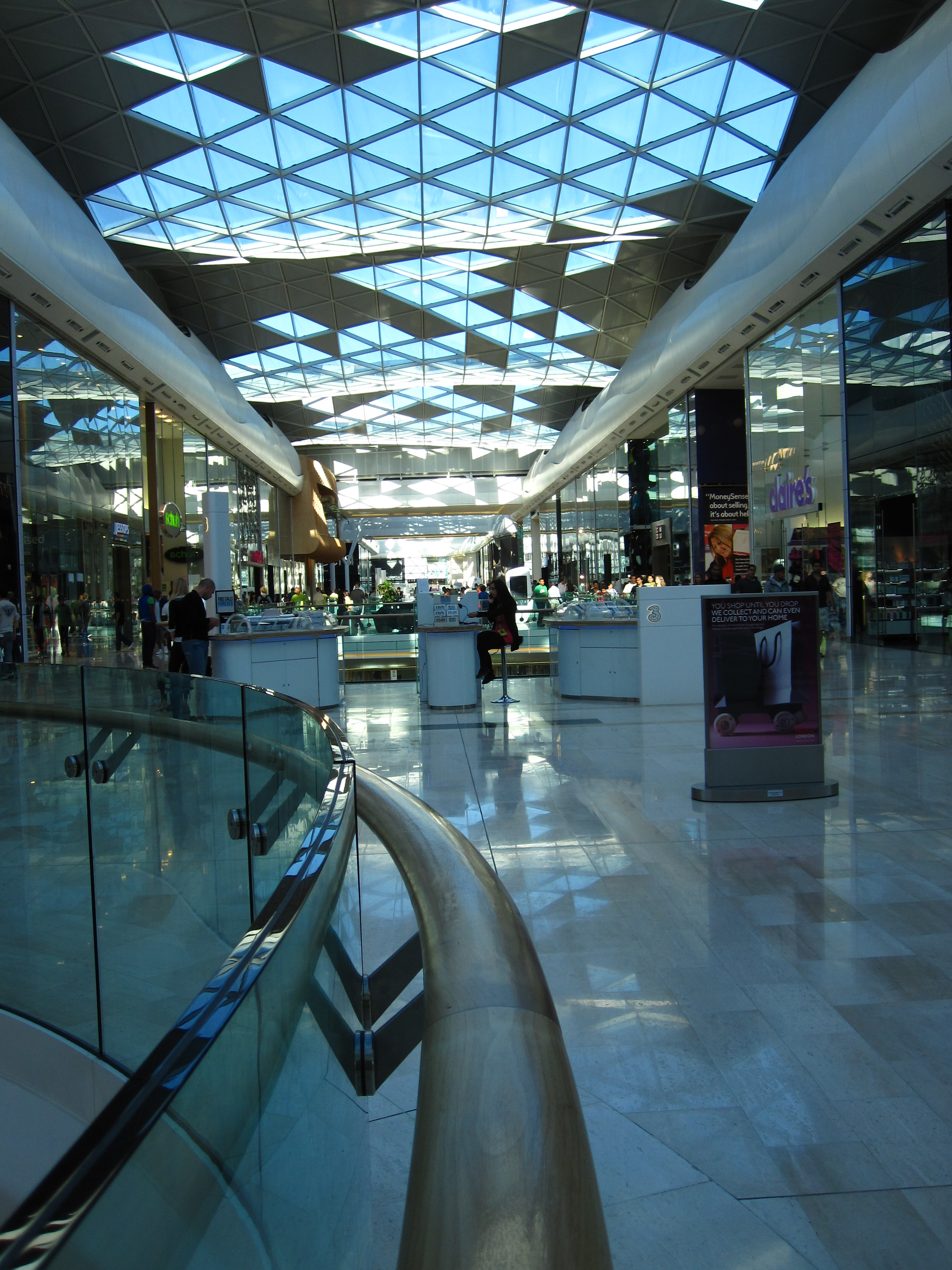
Interior, 2009

It has a retail floor area of 2.6 million square feet (240,000 m^{2}). The centre features around 320 stores and is anchored by 4 anchor tenants.

The centre also has a high-end retail area called The Village and a food court called Eat Gallery.

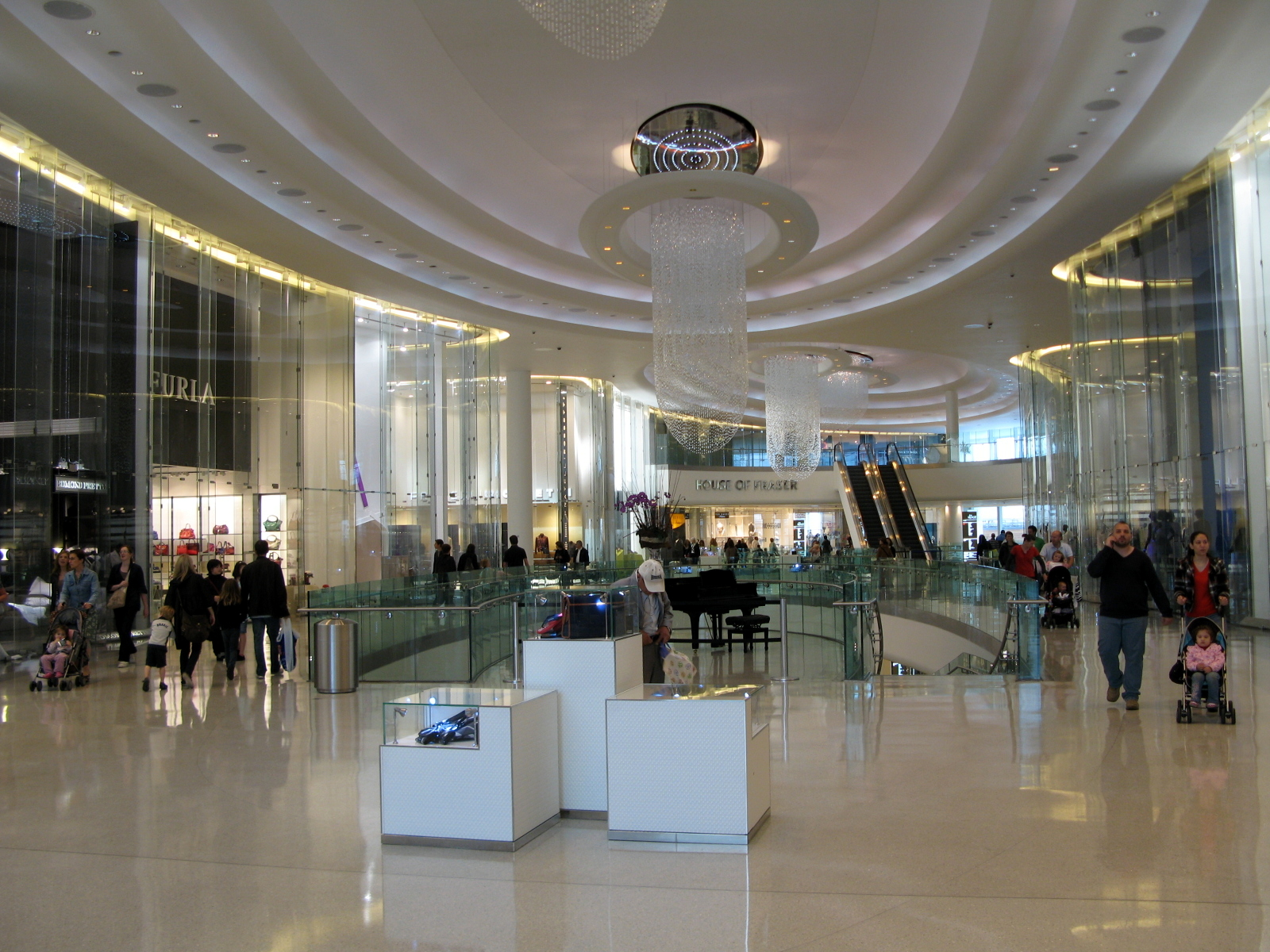
'The Village', 2009

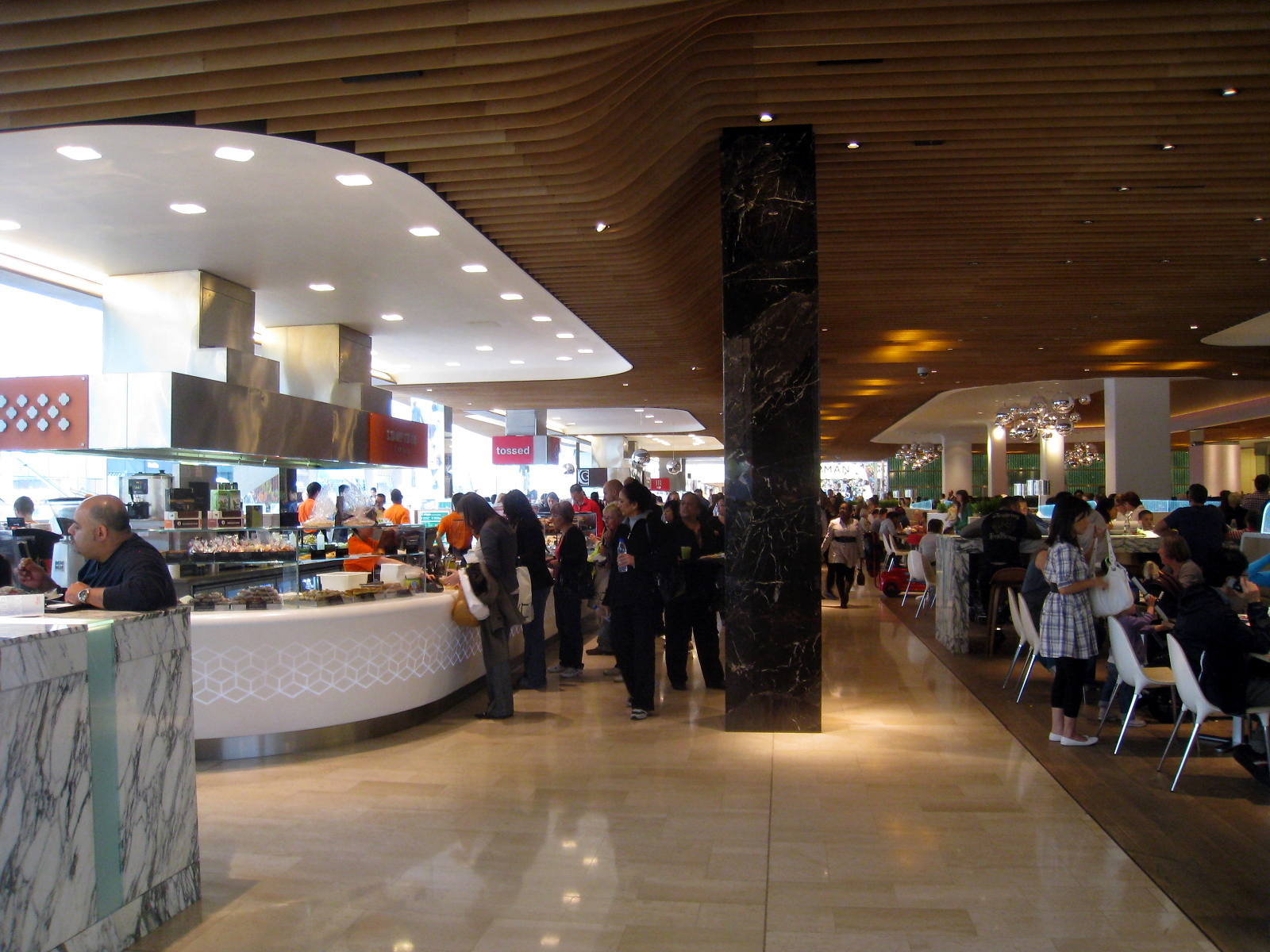
Food Court, 2009

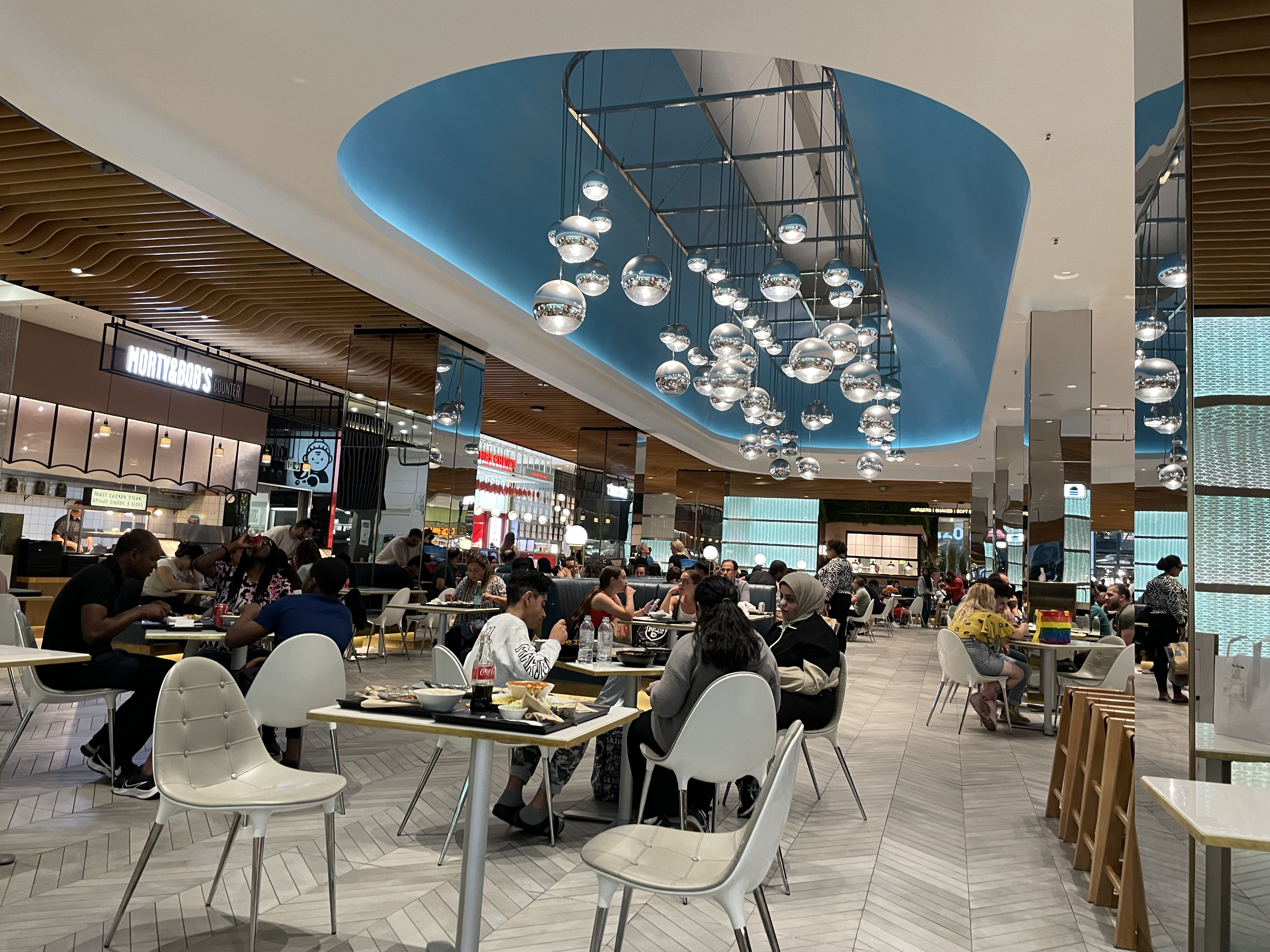
Food Court, 2022

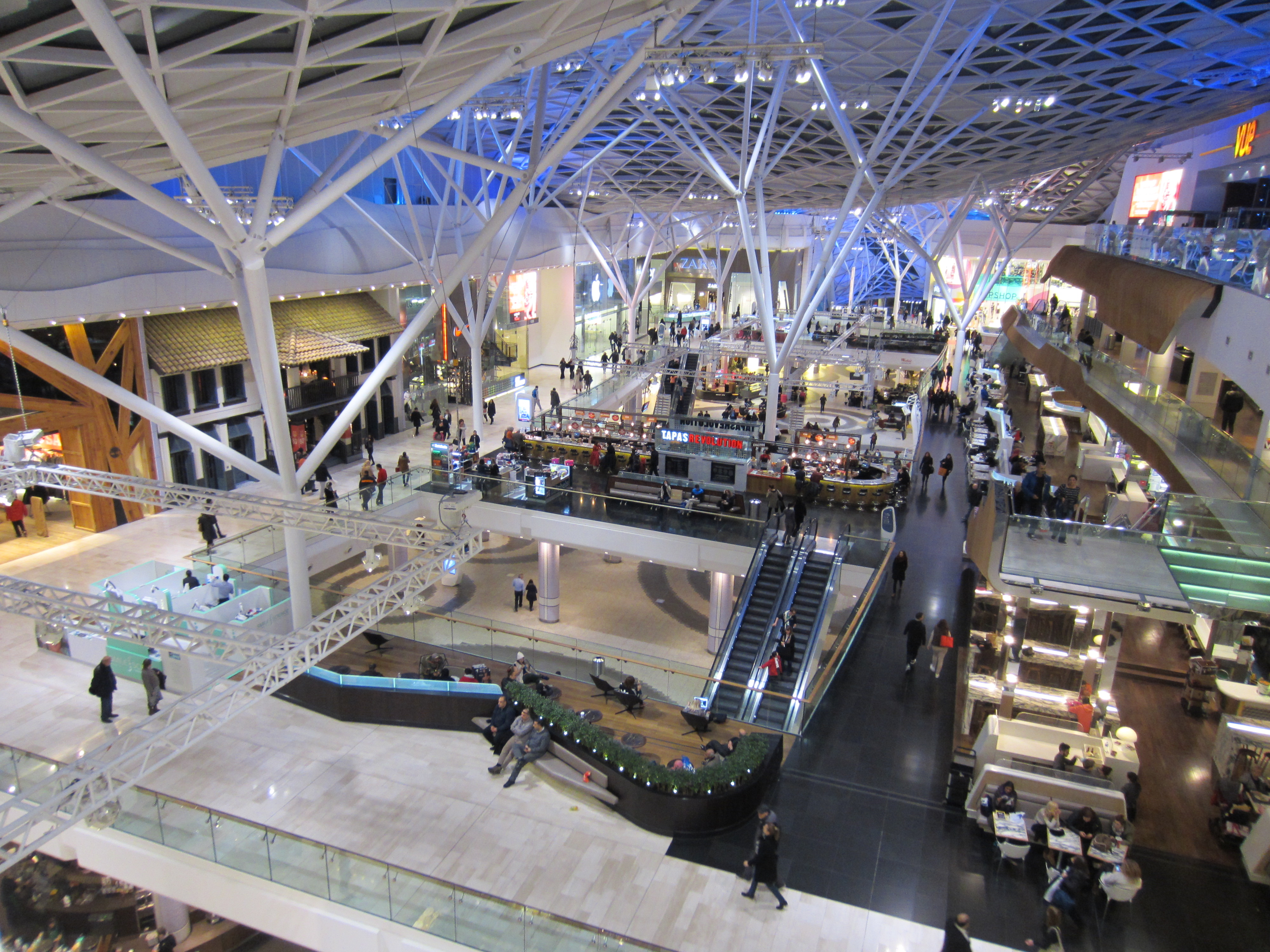
Main Atrium, 2014

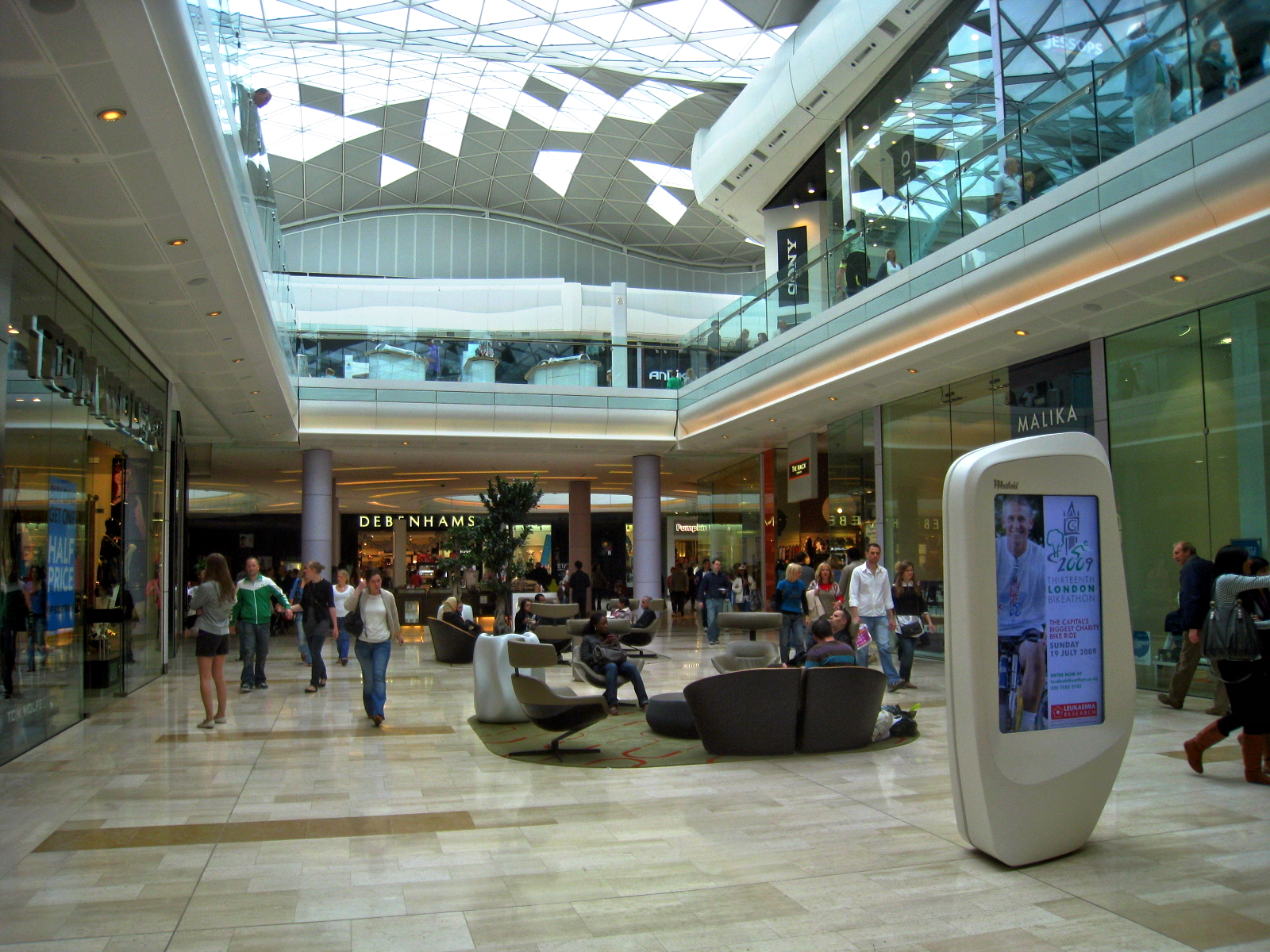
Interior, 2009

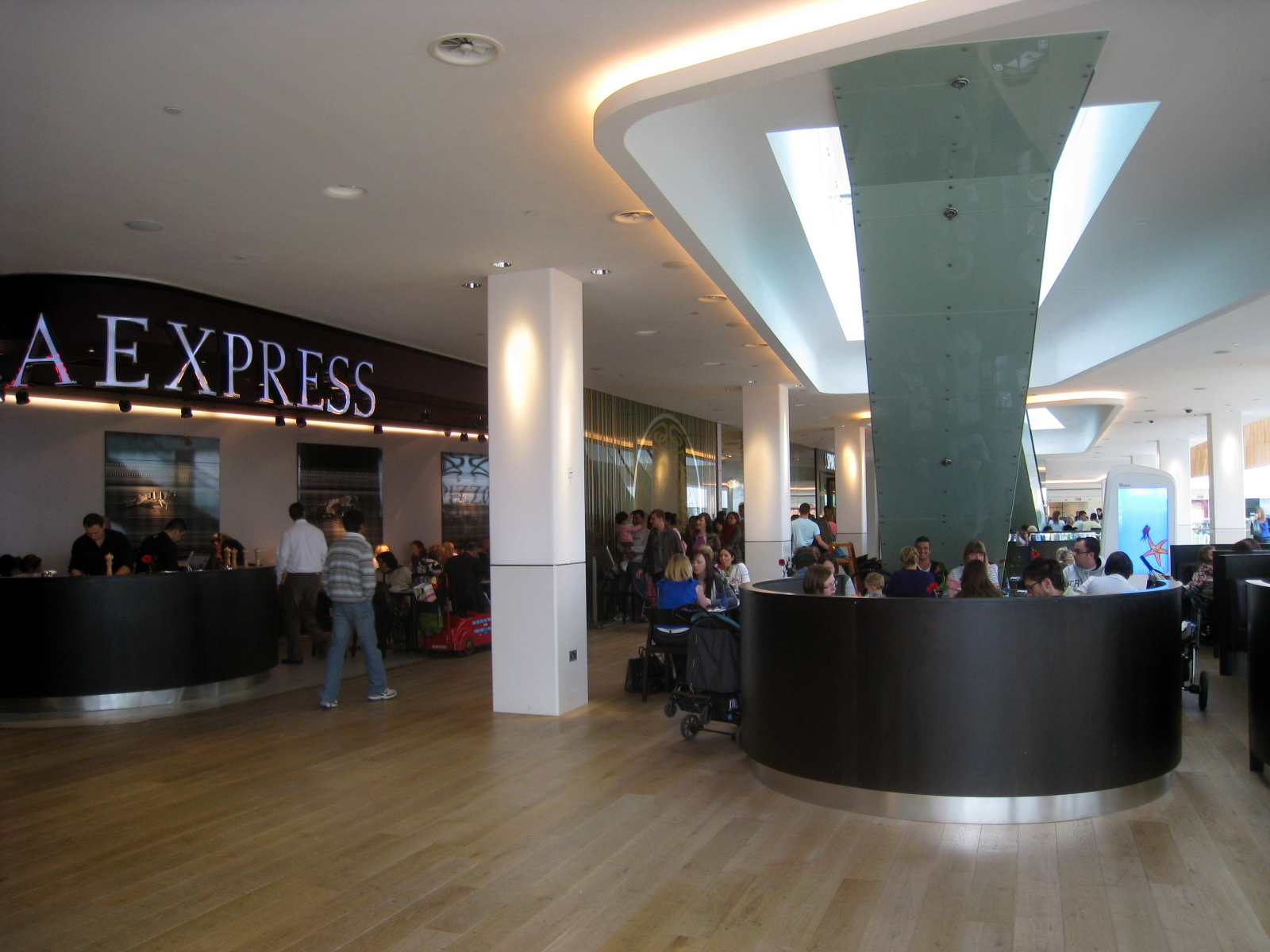
The Loft, 2009

=== Entertainment ===
Vue opened a seventeen-screen cinema on 12 February 2010, including five 3D-enabled screens, with a seating capacity of almost 3,000.

As part of the expansion of the centre, Puttshack opened in July 2018, being promoted as London's first hi-tech indoor mini-golf centre.

== Transport connections ==
As part of the planning permission for the shopping centre, Westfield Group contributed £170m towards local transport improvements, with Transport for London contributing a further £30m. These transport improvements now serve the shopping centre, as well as the surrounding area.

- London Underground: Two Underground stations directly serve the centre, those being Wood Lane station (Circle and Hammersmith & City lines) on the western side, and Shepherd's Bush station (Central line) on the southern side. Additionally, White City and Shepherd's Bush Market stations are short distances away.
- London Overground/Southern: Shepherd's Bush railway station is served by the Mildmay line and Southern services towards Watford Junction and/or East Croydon. The station, which opened on 28 September 2008, is located opposite the Central line station of the same name. The opening of the station was delayed by several months when the finished platform was found to be 18 inches narrower than the required width.
- Bus and taxi: The Shepherd's Bush Interchange is located to the south of the centre next to the Overground station and includes a bus station and a taxi rank. Close to Wood Lane tube station is the White City bus station on Ariel Way. The red brick, Grade II listed Dimco Buildings, which were originally built in 1898 as an electricity generating station for the Central London Railway, was used to stable buses as the current White City bus station. The Dimco buildings were used as a filming location for the ‘Acme Factory’ in the 1988 film Who Framed Roger Rabbit.
- Road links: A grade-separated junction connects to the West Cross Route (A3220), which runs alongside the development site.

== Impact and criticism ==
Before opening, the centre was expected to attract trade that otherwise might have gone to the already busy West End, as well as having a potentially negative impact on nearby Kensington High Street. The development has also pushed up rents in the Shepherd's Bush area, which is expected to impact on the value retail offer in the area, with many businesses as well as the Shepherd's Bush Market expected to suffer. Others have criticised the centre's "clone stores".

In reality, Westfield London has had a transformative effect on the London economy. Westfield London attracts over 27.9 million people annually to the Shepherd's Bush and White City areas, contributing not only to the centre's £1 billion in annual sales but also an increasing economic activity rate among local residents. Westfield London's stores consistently appear among the Shepherd's Bush Green ward's top employers by staff number, as deprivation in the area continues to decrease.

== See also ==
- List of shopping centres in the United Kingdom
- List of shopping centres in the United Kingdom by size
- Westfield Stratford City – a similar development in east London
- Brent Cross Shopping Centre – a similar major shopping centre in north London
