= Queensmill School =

Ormiston Queensmill School

Location
- 1 Askham Road; Shepherd's Bush; London, W12 0NW; England; 51.50712°N 0.24257°W

Information
- Type: Special school; Academy
- Local authority: Hammersmith and Fulham
- Department for Education URN: 147793 Tables
- Ofsted: Reports
- Gender: Co-educational
- Age: 3 to 19
- Website: www.queensmillschool.com

Ormiston Queensmill School is a co-educational special school for autistic children in Shepherd's Bush, London, England. The operator, Ormiston Academies Trust, also operates a school in Kensington, and units at Fulham Primary School and Fulham Cross Academy in Fulham.

== Educational services ==
Ormiston Queensmill School is at 1 Askham Road, Shepherd's Bush, and serves students aged 3–19 with moderate to complex autism in a three-storey building. As of July 2015, its enrolment was approximately 140. In summer 2024, approximately 70% of pupils were from the borough of Hammersmith and Fulham, and the rest from other boroughs including Kensington and Chelsea and Westminster.

The school is operated by Ormiston Academies Trust, which also operates a purpose-built school for students aged 3–19, Kensington Queensmill School, in Barlby Road in Kensington; Queensmill College, for students 20 and above, at 50 Ellerslie Road in Shepherd's Bush; and units for primary-school students at Fulham Primary School and for Key Stage 4 students at Fulham Cross Academy, both in Fulham.

== History ==
Queensmill School began as a community school administered by Hammersmith and Fulham London Borough Council which educated autistic children aged 3–11 in a Victorian building in Clancarty Road in Fulham. After expanding to include secondary school, in the mid-2010s the school temporarily relocated to a site in West Kensington during construction of a specially designed building in Askham Road in Shepherds Bush. The new building has an on-site kitchen and the school hired a chef, Djalma Lucio Polli de Carvalho, with noticeable positive effects on students.

In 2021 Queensmill School converted to academy status under the sponsorship of Queen Charlotte Education Special Trust, now Ormiston Academies Trust.

After previously being rated 'excellent' by Ofsted, in March 2022 Queensmill School received an 'inadequate' rating following an inspection on 16 and 17 November 2021. Problems noted included failures in updating records on student medications and in verifying background checks had been completed on new staff, and a lack of understanding of current guidance on safeguarding. On 21 April 2022, the Department for Education issued the school a termination warning notice. The Head of School, Aymeline Bel, issued a statement that the school was short-staffed because of Brexit and the COVID pandemic, had not completed all paperwork, and in hindsight should have filled all necessary positions before reopening. Ofsted rated the school 'good' in April 2023.

The Queensmill Trust has complained that Hammersmith and Fulham does not give the school sufficient 'top-up funding' to meet the costs of the required Education, Health and Care Plans for students from the borough. The trust has agreed to merge with Ormiston Academies Trust for financial reasons.

== Notable former pupils ==
- Stephen Wiltshire, artist
