= White City, London =

District in the London Borough of Hammersmith and Fulham, England

Coordinates: 51.511°N 0.238°W

White City
- Location within Greater London
- Population: 13,389 (Wormholt and White City Ward 2011)
- OS grid reference: TQ233807
- London borough: Hammersmith & Fulham
- Ceremonial county: Greater London
- Region: London
- Country: England
- Sovereign state: United Kingdom
- Post town: LONDON
- Postcode district: W12, W10
- Postcode district: NW10
- Dialling code: 020
- Police: Metropolitan
- Fire: London
- Ambulance: London
- UK Parliament: Hammersmith and Chiswick
- London Assembly: West Central

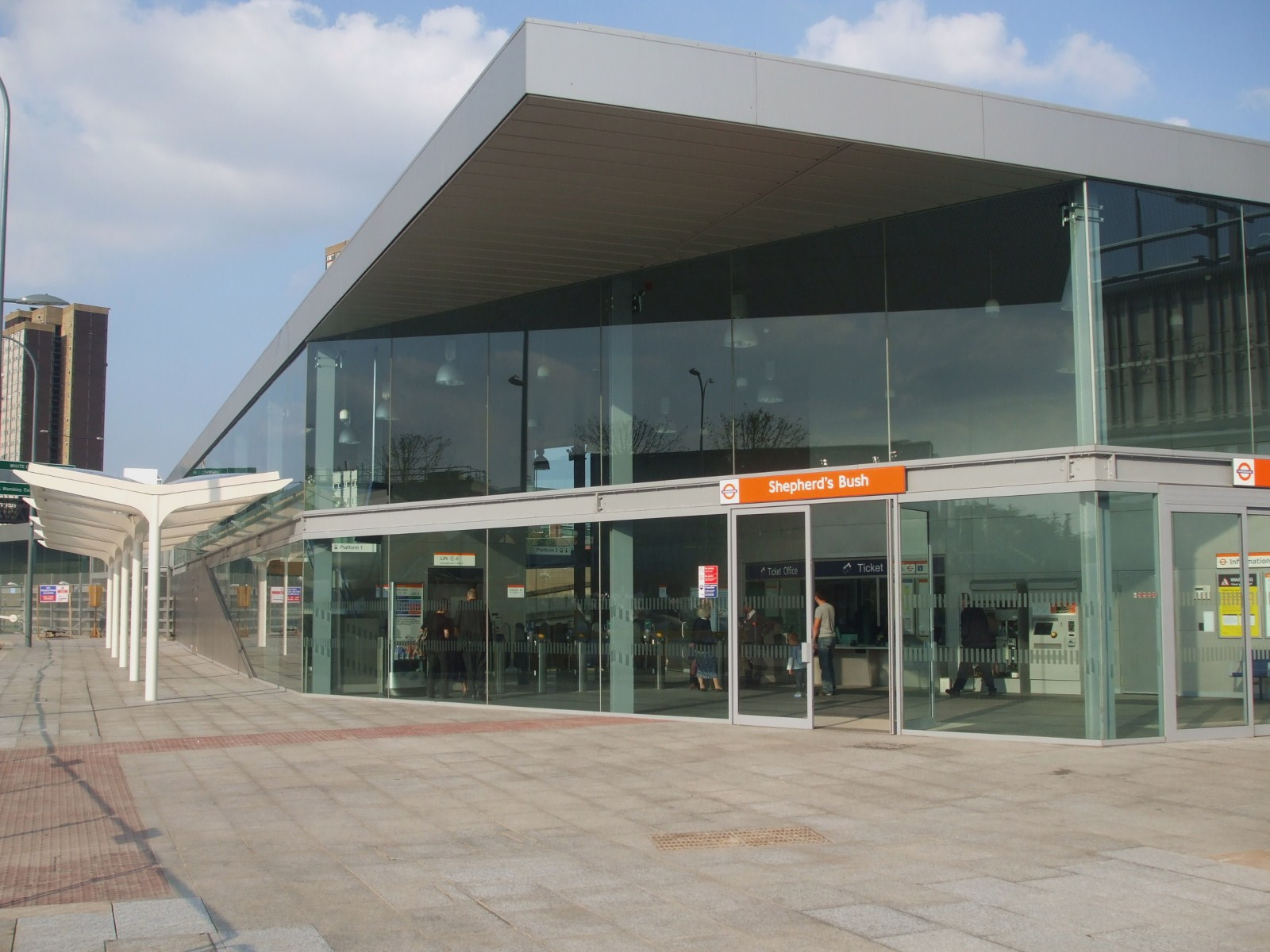
Shepherd's Bush railway station

White City is a district of London, England, in the northern part of Shepherd's Bush in the London Borough of Hammersmith and Fulham, 5 miles (8 km) west-northwest of Charing Cross. White City is home to Television Centre, White City Place, Westfield London and Loftus Road, the home stadium of Queens Park Rangers F.C. The district got its name from the white marble cladding used on buildings during several exhibitions when the area was first developed, between 1908 and 1914.

== History ==
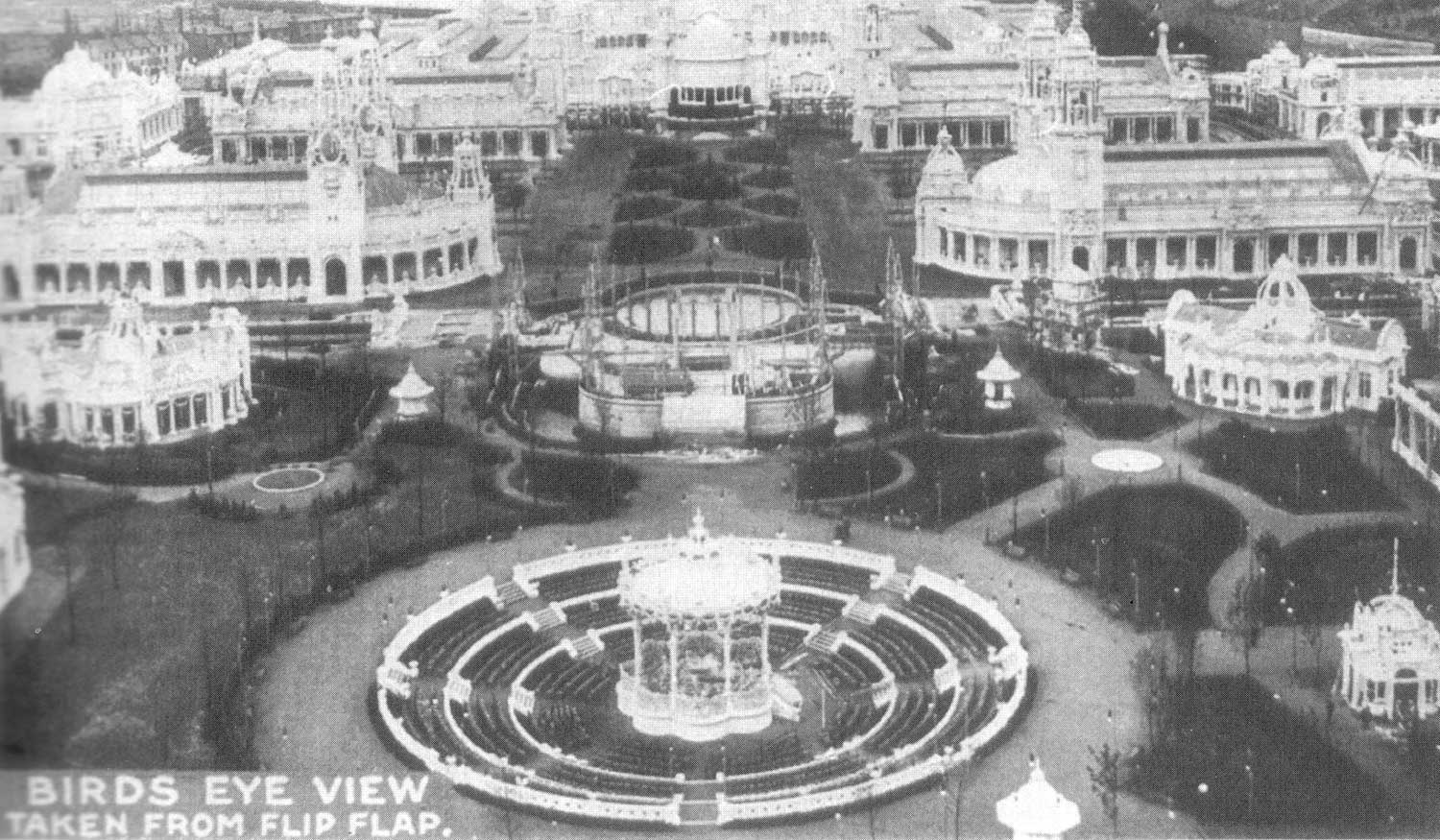
Bird's eye view of part of the Franco-British Exhibition (1908)

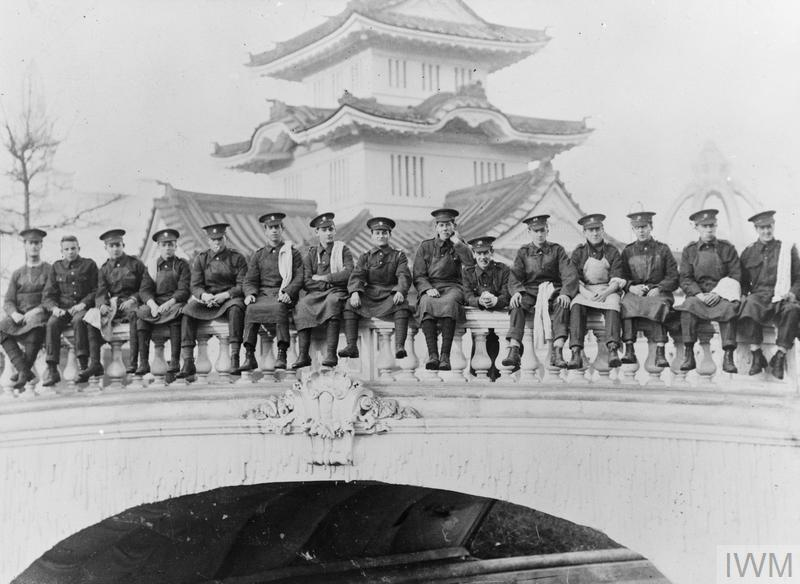
Men of Kitchener's Army, stationed at White City, London, 24 November 1914

The area now called White City was level arable farmland until 1908, when it was used as the site of the Franco-British Exhibition and the 1908 Summer Olympics. In 1909 the exhibition site hosted the Imperial International Exhibition and in 1910, the Japan–British Exhibition. The final two exhibitions to be held there were the Latin-British Exhibition (1912) and the Anglo-American Exposition (1914), which was brought to a premature end by the outbreak of the First World War. During this period it was known as the Great White City because the fibrous plaster used to construct the exhibition pavilions had the appearance of white marble, and hence the name given to this part of Shepherd's Bush. Apartment blocks for lower-income residents were constructed in the 1930s.

=== White City Stadium, BBC White City and White City Place ===
White City Stadium, in the northern section of the district, also known as the Great Stadium and seating 66,000, was officially opened by King Edward VII on 27 April 1908 for the 1908 Summer Olympics. The starting point of the marathon race at the 1908 Summer Olympics was at Windsor Castle creating a distance of 42.195 km (26.219 mi) or 26 miles 385 yards to the finishing line at White City stadium. In 1921, this was adopted as the standard distance for marathon races; previously the distance had varied slightly. After the Olympics, the stadium continued to be used for athletics until 1914, and, in 1927, it was turned into a greyhound racing track, although it was also used for short periods by Queens Park Rangers football club, and for other sports. In 1931, a 440-yard (402.3 m) running track was installed for the Amateur Athletic Association Championships, held there from 1932 to 1970. It also hosted the match between Uruguay and France during the 1966 FIFA World Cup.

In 1934, the American rodeo promoter Tex Austin staged the World's Championship Rodeo at White City Stadium. Champion cowboys and cowgirls from Canada and the United States participated, including Pete Knight, Weldon Bascom, Clark Lund, Ted Elder, and Vera McGinnis. The world's most famous rodeo bucking horse, Midnight, was brought out of retirement for one last rodeo. The month-long rodeo was held from 9 June to 6 July with ten shows per week. Pathé News filmed some of the events. The Stadium was home to the White City Rebels motorcycle speedway team, part of the inaugural British League in 1929 and from 1976 to 1978. Speedway was run first in 1928 and occasional meetings were run from 1953 to 1958, in 1961 and from 1979 to 1983. The stadium was demolished starting in late 1984 to make way for the BBC White City building. The athletes of the 1908 Summer Olympics are commemorated with a list inscribed on the side of the BBC Broadcast Centre Building, and the athletics finish line is marked in the paving outside the building.

In 1960, BBC Television Centre was built near the former site of the White City Stadium. It was damaged by the Real IRA in the 2001 BBC bombing. The bomb went off on Wood Lane, in front of the Television Centre news building. In October 2007, BBC announced plans to sell Television Centre as part of a cost-cutting programme. In June 2008, English Heritage announced its recommendation to list parts of Television Centre as a grade II listed building. In July 2012, BBC sold Television Centre to a partnership consisting of Stanhope plc, Mitsui Fudosan and AIMCo for £200 million. It was redeveloped but original features of the buildings including the "doughnut", atomic dot wall and Helios statue were retained.

The redeveloped Television Centre was opened to the public and will offer entertainment and leisure facilities, including a new branch of members' club Soho House, offices aimed at the creative sector and approximately 1,000 new homes, together with pedestrian access through the site providing connectivity with the local area, including Hammersmith Park. BBC Studioworks (formerly BBC S&PP) moved back to Television Centre in 2017 to operate Studios 1, 2 and 3. BBC Worldwide moved into office space in the Stage 6 building following extensive refurbishment in 2015.

Landowners in the area, including White City Living by St James, Westfield London, Stanhope and Imperial College London are in the process of redeveloping the site into White City Place, which will provide 5,000+ new homes, 2 million square feet of commercial office space, 30 acres of public space, and 19,000 jobs.

=== White City Estate ===
To house the growing population of Shepherd's Bush, a five-storey housing estate was built in the late 1930s and after World War II, which also took the name of the White City. Streets were named after countries that had featured in the exhibitions.

The estate is served by a Roman Catholic Church, Our Lady of Fatima (1955) and an Anglican church, St Michael and St George (1955) both on Commonwealth Avenue.

=== Westfield London ===
On 30 October 2008, Westfield London opened.

In July 2015, terrorists tried to blow up the Westfield London but they were stopped by police. They wanted the bombing to be around the same day as the 10th anniversary of the 7 July 2005 London bombings.

== Politics ==
White City is part of the White City ward for elections to Hammersmith and Fulham London Borough Council.

== Transport ==
Two stations were built to serve the centre close to the sites of closed former London Underground stations:

- Wood Lane on the Circle line and the Hammersmith & City line, located to provide a walking distance connection with the Central line station at White City.
- Shepherd's Bush on the West London line, to the east of the site adjacent to the Holland Park roundabout and served by London Overground trains. It is also a short walking distance from Shepherd's Bush tube station served by the Central line.

== Education ==
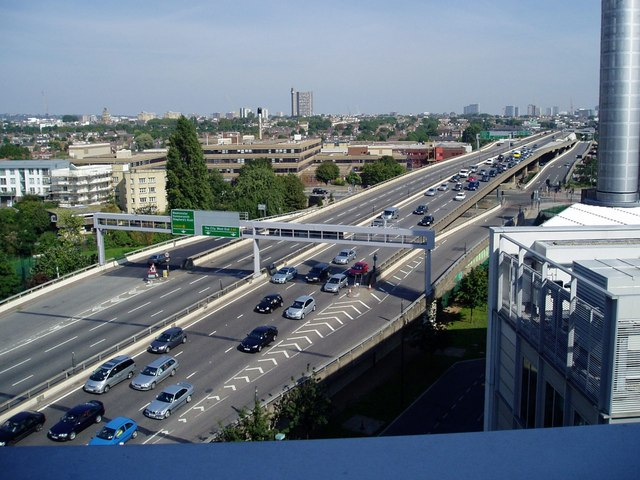
Westway flyover junction at Ladbroke Grove, looking east

Imperial College London purchased the BBC Woodlands site for 28 million pounds in 2009 and demolished it the following year. Sections of this second major campus started opening in most notably an "innovation hub" for the college, including research facilities and commercialisation space, as well as postgraduate accommodation. The chemistry department moved much of its research to the new Molecular Sciences Research Hub on the campus in 2018, with further departments and industry partners moving to the campus and surrounding area over the coming years. The campus is also home to the Invention Rooms, a college hackerspace and community outreach centre.

Schools in the area include Ark Burlington Danes Academy and Phoenix Academy

== Nearest places ==
- Wormwood Scrubs
- Notting Hill
- Kensal Green
- Bayswater
- Harlesden
- North Kensington
- Acton
- West Kensington
- Shepherd's Bush

== Nearest railway stations ==
- Shepherd's Bush

== Notable People ==
- Daisy Waugh
- Michael Olise

== In art and literature ==
- Pete Townshend, a former resident of Shepherd's Bush, released a solo album entitled White City: A Novel in November 1985 on Atco. The title refers to a story which accompanies the album and which takes place in the London area of White City. A related film was also produced.
- North of the Westfield shopping centre itself, the grade II listed Dimco Buildings (1898), now refurbished as a bus depot were used as the location for the 'Acme Factory' in the 1988 film Who Framed Roger Rabbit.
- The Bill Slider Novels of Cynthia Harrod-Eagles are set in Shepherd's Bush and the first title, Orchestrated Death, begins with a body found in a White City flat.
- Some parts of Nuns on the Run are filmed here; the BBC White City building, Wood Lane and the Central Line.

== See also ==
- History of Shepherd's Bush

== Gallery ==
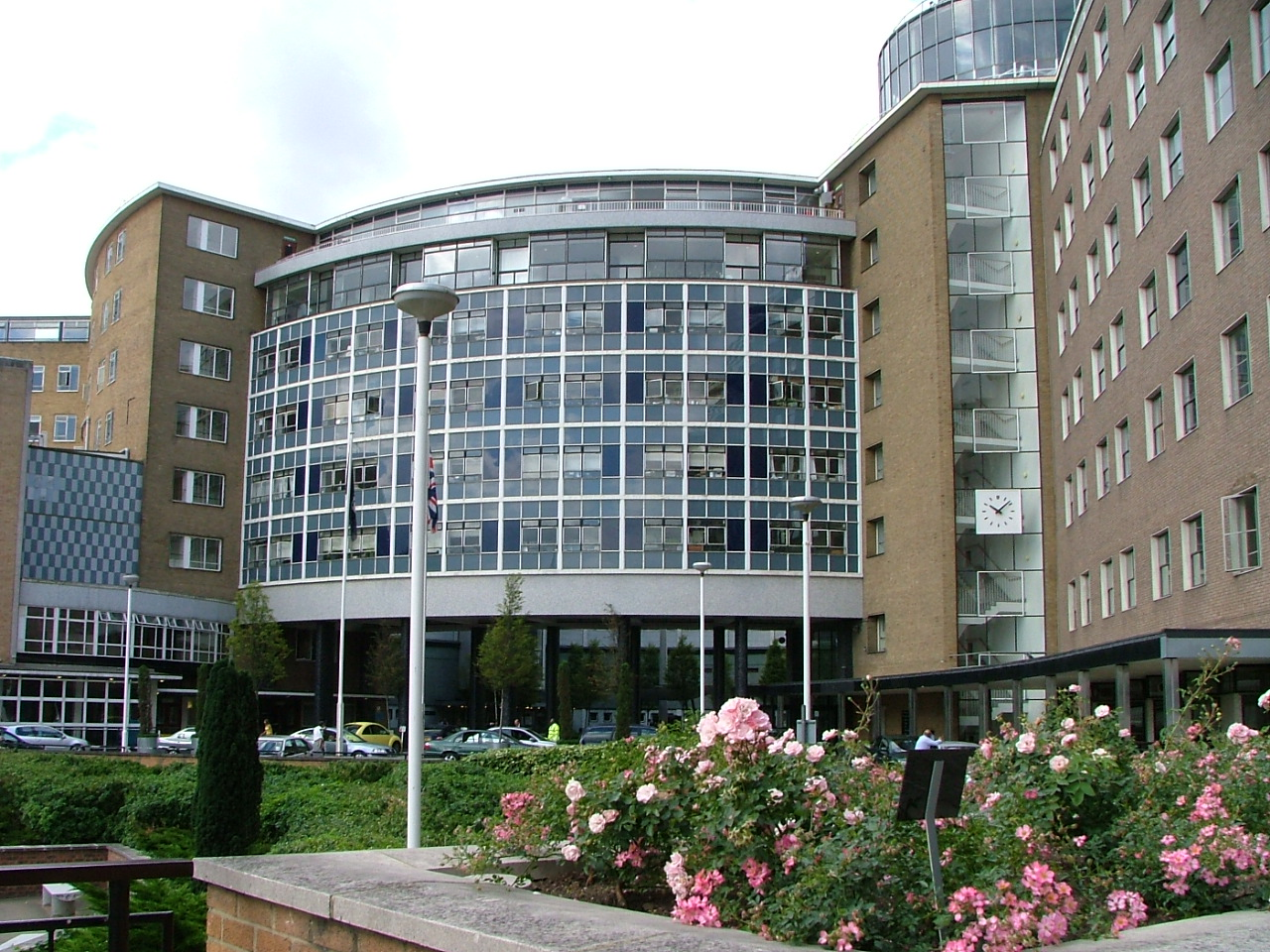
BBC Television Centre

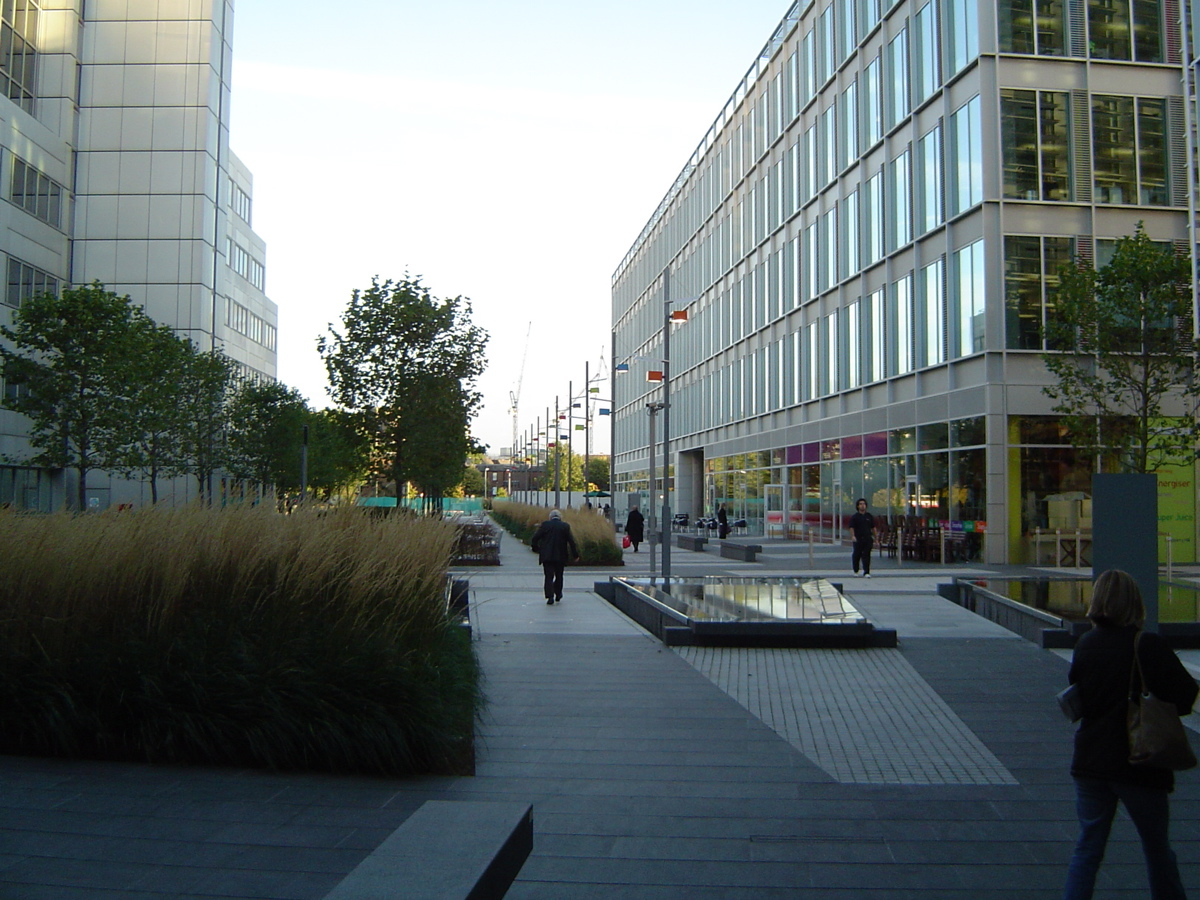
The BBC Media Village, on the site of the Olympic Stadium

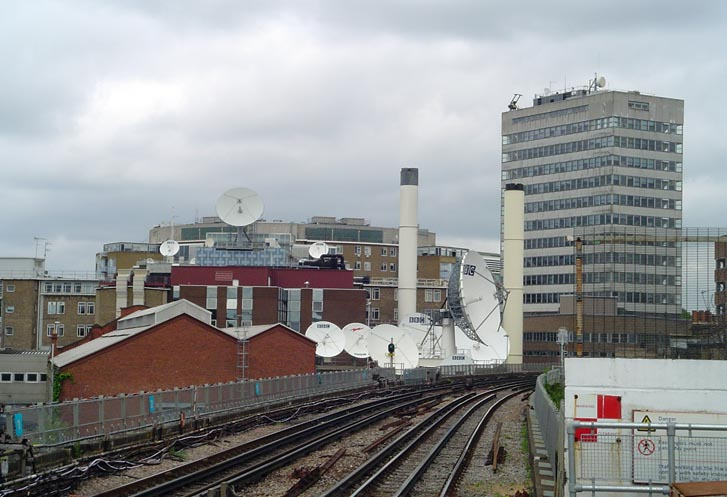
BBC TV centre, seen from Shepherd's Bush Market tube station

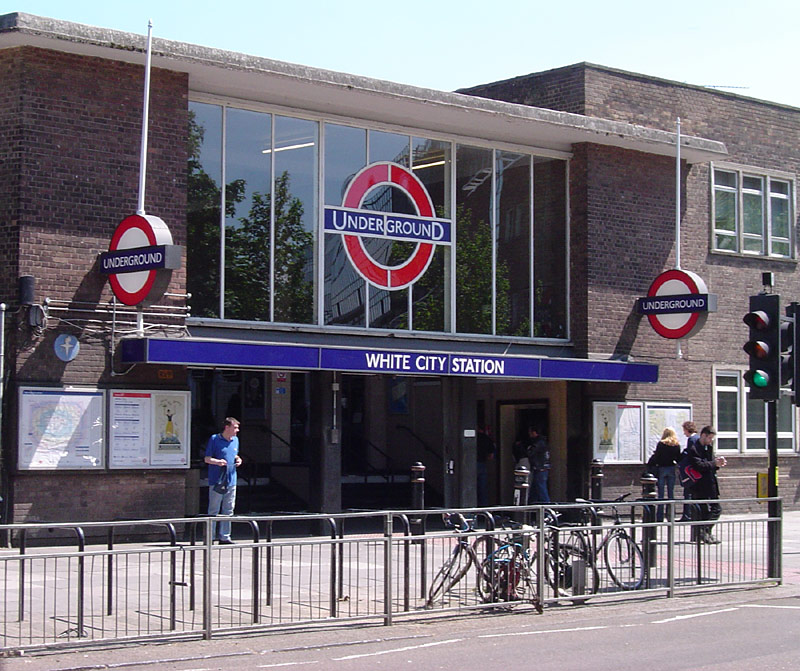
White City tube station

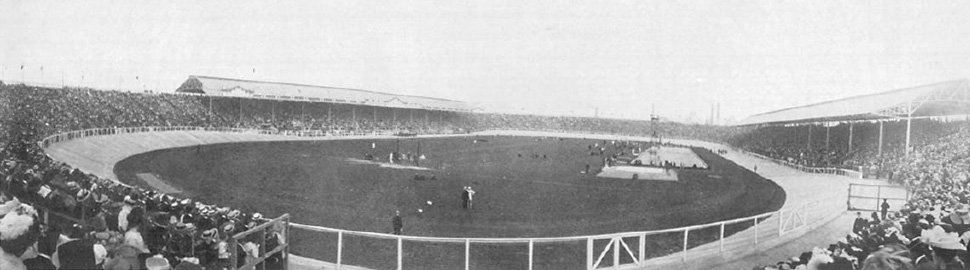
The White City Stadium in 1908

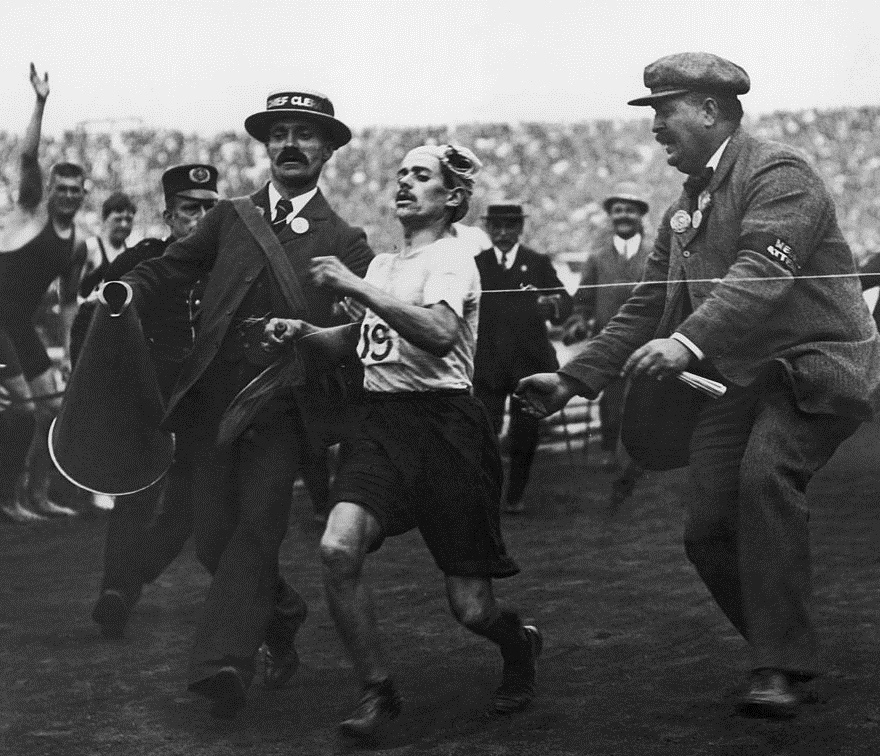
The 1908 Olympic marathon

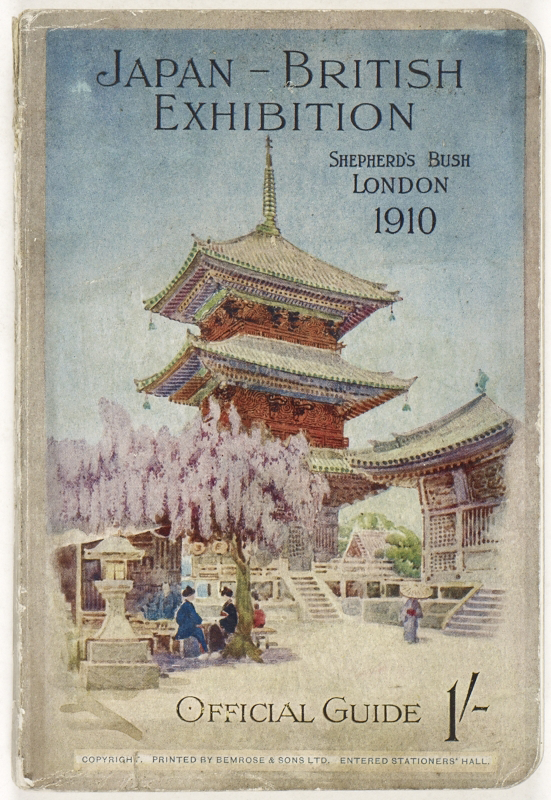
The Japan-British Exhibition of 1910

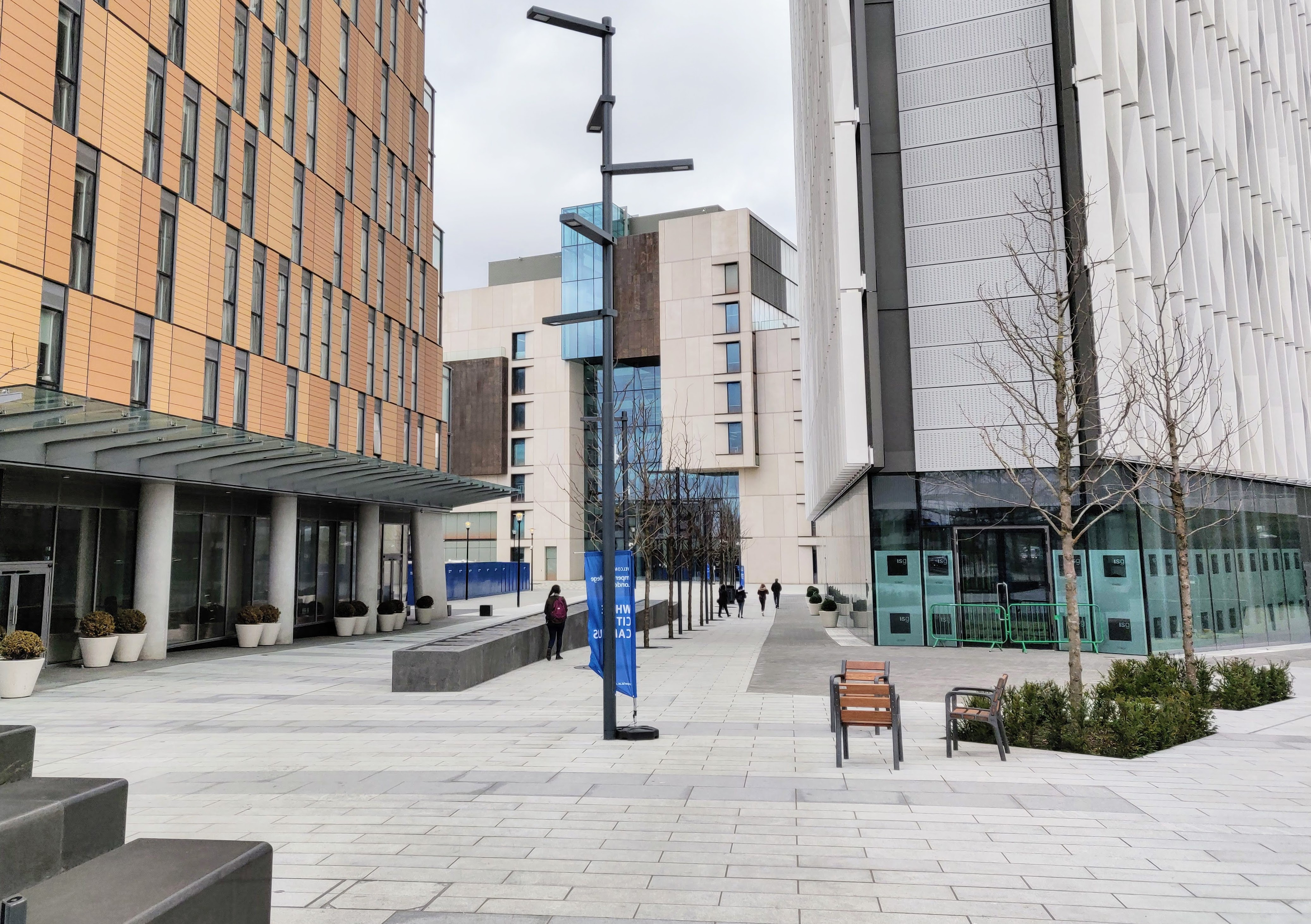
Imperial College London campus
