= Fulham Cross Academy =

Location
- Kingwood Road; Fulham, London, SW6 6SN; England; 51.4776°N 0.2150°W

Information
- Type: Academy
- Trust: Fulham Cross Academy Trust
- Specialist: STEM
- Department for Education URN: 139364 Tables
- Ofsted: Reports
- Executive Principal: Sally Brooks
- Gender: Coeducational
- Age: 11 to 19
- Website: www.fulhamcrossacademy.co.uk

Fulham Cross Academy is a coeducational secondary school and sixth form located in the Fulham area of the London Borough of Hammersmith and Fulham, England. It is a STEM specialist school.

== History ==
It was previously known as Henry Compton Secondary School but reopened as Fulham College Boys' School in September 2012.

Previously a foundation school administered by Hammersmith and Fulham London Borough Council, in March 2013 Fulham College Boys' School converted to academy status. The school is now sponsored by the Fulham Cross Academy Trust.

In September 2020 the school was renamed Fulham Cross Academy and accepted girls for the first time, becoming coeducational. The main kingwood building is Grade II listed and has been refurbished from 2020 to 2021.

== Results ==
18% of all grades were at grade 7 and above in 2024. Notable achievements have been seen in History, where over a third of grades were grade 7 and above, and in Triple Sciences, especially Biology, where over 40% were in grade 7 and above.

== Facilities ==
Facilities include specialist science and design and technology blocks, a multi-use Astroturf sports pitch and gym on site and a fully equipped performing arts centre.

== Sixth form ==
Fulham Cross Academy operates a sixth form provision in conjunction with Fulham Cross Girls' School. The sixth form is housed in a building that was formerly Fulham Enterprise Studio.

== Notable former pupils ==
=== Henry Compton School ===
- Shaun Bailey, Conservative parliamentary candidate
- Linford Christie, track athlete
- George Cohen, played for Fulham F.C. and England, the right full back in the 1966 World Cup Final
- Ade Coker, footballer
- Eddie Kadi, comedian, presenter and actor
- Jody Morris, footballer, midfield for Chelsea
- Paul Mortimer, footballer, midfield for Charlton Athletic
- Roy Williams, playwright
