= Fulham Cross Girls' School =

Coordinates: 51.4816°N 0.2134°W

Location
- Munster Road; Fulham, London, SW6 6BP; England

Information
- Type: Academy
- Trust: Fulham Cross Academy Trust
- Department for Education URN: 139365 Tables
- Ofsted: Reports
- Executive Principal: Sally Brooks
- Gender: Female
- Age: 11 to 16
- Website: www.fulhamcross.net

Fulham Cross Girls’ School (FCGS) is a secondary school with academy status for girls aged 11–16, located in the Fulham area of the London Borough of Hammersmith and Fulham, England.

The school is part of the Fulham Cross Academy Trust, alongside Fulham Cross Academy.

Although the school does not have its own sixth form, graduating pupils have admissions priority for the sixth form operated by Fulham Cross Academy.

The school converted to an academy in 2013 (13 years ago). As of 2021, it has not been inspected by Ofsted since then, although there was a monitoring visit in 2015.

== History ==
In 1973, the school was established as Fulham Gilliatt Comprehensive School, as a result of the merging of Fulham County School, a selective school, and Gilliatt School. The first headteacher was Yvonne Lillian Harrison, who had previously been head of Fulham County School from 1969. She was in post until December 1974. The merger of the schools was described by the new deputy head as a "traumatic period".

== Notable staff ==
- Alison Uttley
