= White City Depot =

London Underground traction maintenance depot

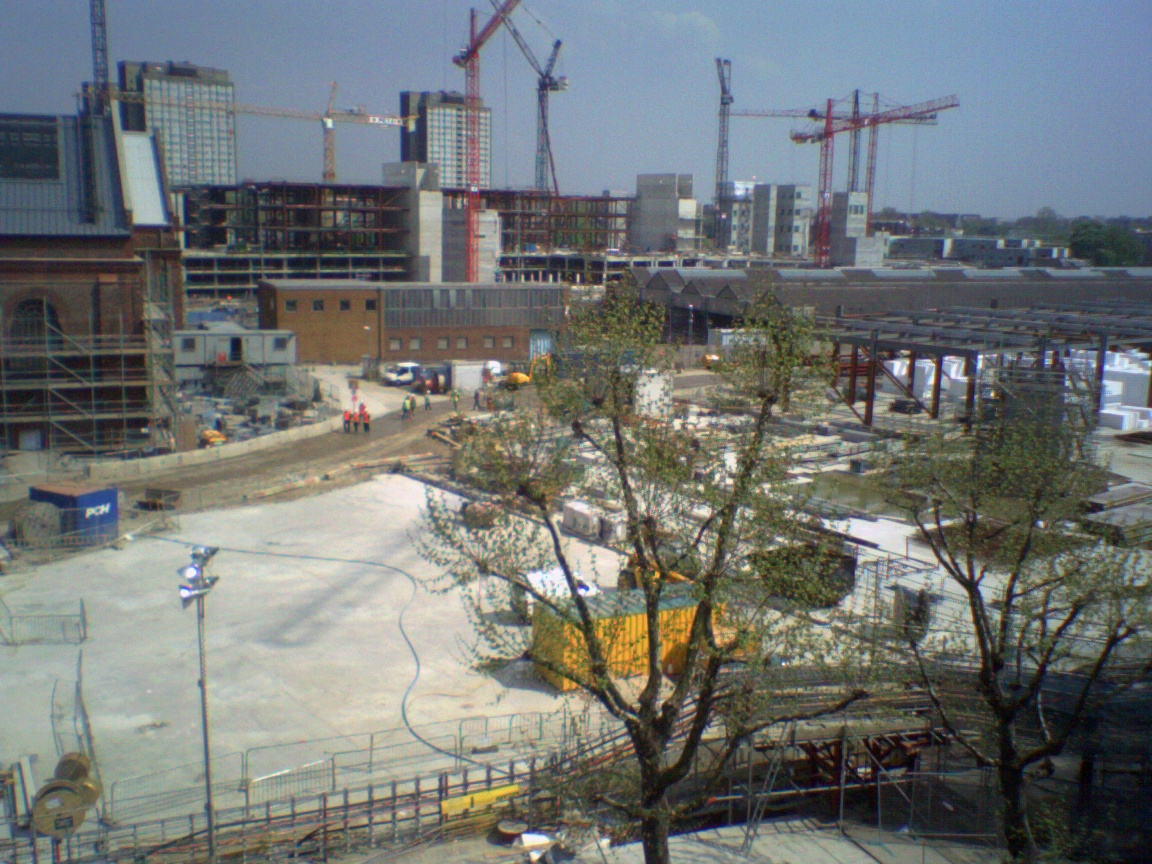
- White City Depot under construction in 2006
- Interactive map of White City Depot

Location
- Location: White City, London, England
- Coordinates: 51.507157°N 0.223453°W

Characteristics
- Owner: London Underground
- Type: Electric multiple unit
- Roads: 16
- Rolling stock: 1992 Stock

History
- Opened: 1900 (original); 2007 (current)

White City Depot is one of three traction maintenance depots on the Central line of the London Underground. It is located between Shepherd's Bush and White City tube stations. A depot on the site first opened in 1900 by the Central London Railway when the line first went into operation. A new underground depot opened in 2007, as part of the Westfield London shopping centre development. This makes it one of only two depots on the London Underground to be completely underground, the other being Waterloo Underground Depot on the Waterloo and City line.

== History ==
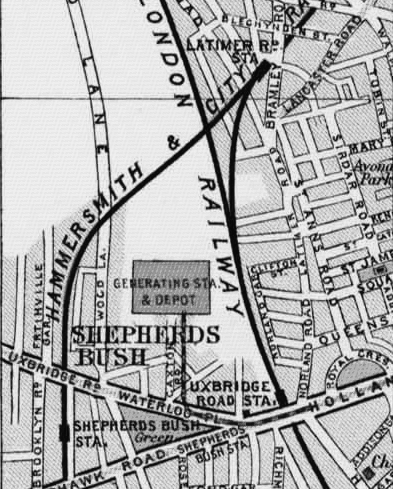
1900 map showing the depot with the generating station

Originally called Wood Lane depot, the depot became operational on 1 March 1900 when the first trains were test-run to Queen's Road (now Queensway). The CLR opened on 30 July 1900, with a sharp curve west of Shepherd's Bush tube station to reach the depot, which was also used as a reversing siding. On 14 May 1908, the line was extended to Wood Lane station at the north end of the site to serve the Franco-British Exhibition with an anti-clockwise loop back to Shepherd's Bush station. Wood Lane station was closed in 1947 when White City station was opened to the north.

On the depot site was the CLR's power station which generated the electricity to run the railway's trains. The power station closed on 18 March 1928 when power began to be supplied from Lots Road Power Station. Later used as a workshop by an engineering company, the power station buildings, now known as the Dimco Buildings, remain and now serve as part of White City bus station.

=== 2000s rebuild ===
As part of the construction of the Westfield London shopping centre, the original depot along with the disused Wood Lane platforms and station building were demolished. A new depot was built in a slightly different location, located directly beneath the shopping centre – funded by Westfield. The new depot opened in January 2007, with 16 stabling sidings, one more than previously. Since the 1990s, all trains stabled at the depot are 1992 Stock.

== See also ==
- Hainault depot
- Ruislip depot
