= White City tube station =

London Underground station

White City
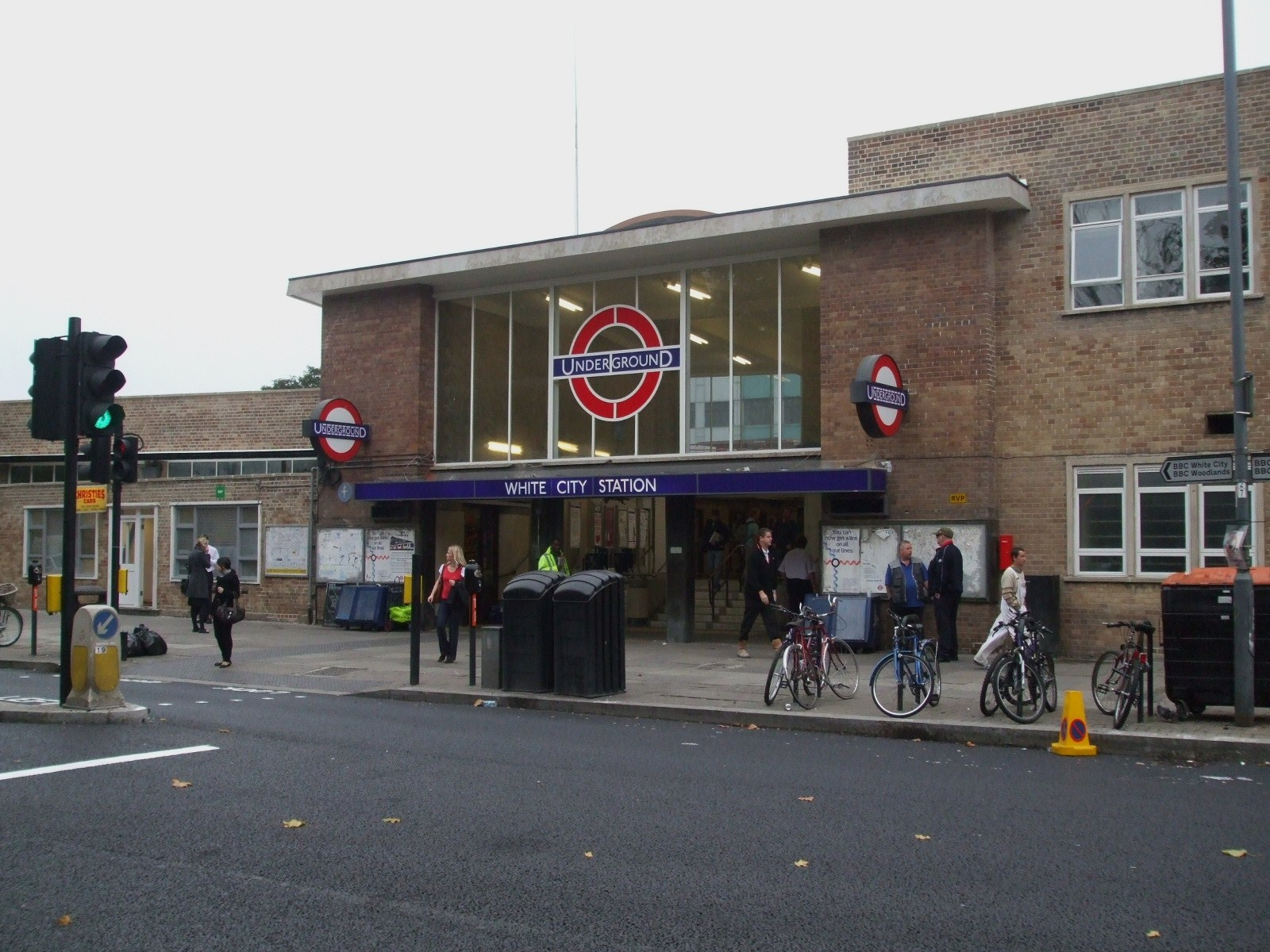
- Station entrance in 2008
- Interactive map of White City

General information
- Location: White City
- Local authority: Hammersmith and Fulham
- Managed by: London Underground
- Number of platforms: 4
- Tracks: 3
- Fare zone: 2
- OSI: Wood Lane

London Underground annual entry and exit
- 2021: ▲4.62 million
- 2022: ▲7.39 million
- 2023: ▲7.89 million
- 2024: ▼7.83 million
- 2025: ▲7.95 million

Railway companies
- Original company: London Passenger Transport Board

Key dates
- 3 August 1920: Line opened
- 23 November 1947: Station opened

Other information
- External links: TfL station info page
- Coordinates: 51.512083°N 0.224583°W

White City is a London Underground station, located on Wood Lane in White City, west London, England. It is on the Central line between East Acton and Shepherd's Bush stations, and is in London fare zone 2. The station is in a deep brick-sided cutting – and is designed in a similar way to Harrow-on-the-Hill station.

== History ==
The station was opened on 23 November 1947, replacing the earlier Wood Lane station. Its construction started after 1938 and had been scheduled for completion by 1940, but the Second World War delayed its opening for another seven years. The architectural design of the station won an award at the Festival of Britain and a commemorative plaque recording this is attached to the building to the left of the main entrance.

== The station today ==
An interesting feature of the station is that the line adopts right-hand running through the station rather than the conventional left-hand running. This is a historical consequence of the reversal of the tracks in the tunnels of the anti-clockwise loop track built for the now-disused Wood Lane station, situated a short distance to the south of White City which was opened in 1908 as the then western terminus of the Central London Railway. The two tracks return to their normal left-hand orientation by a surface fly-over roughly halfway between White City and East Acton stations.

The station's running layout has three tracks, with the centre track having platforms on each side meaning that it can handle trains running in either direction. A siding between the running lines to the north of the station allows trains from Central London to be reversed and run back eastwards. Trains going out of service can return to the below-ground White City depot to the south of the station via sidings between the running lines.

The nearby Wood Lane station on the Circle and Hammersmith & City lines provides an interchange between the lines.

This station is also directly opposite the BBC Television Centre and is within walking distance of Loftus Road, home of Queens Park Rangers F.C. and Westfield London.

The station received a certificate of merit in the 2009 National Railway Heritage Awards, London Regional category, for the modernisation (completed in 2008) that took care to retain heritage and architectural features.

== Similarly named station ==
An earlier Wood Lane station on the Metropolitan line was located a short distance to the south and was also known as White City from 23 November 1947 until its closure in 1959.

== Connections ==
London Buses routes 72, 95, 220, 228, 272 and night route N72 serve the station directly. White City bus station is a few minutes walk south of the station.

| Preceding station | London Underground | Following station |
|---|---|---|
| East Acton towards Ealing Broadway or West Ruislip | Central line | Shepherd's Bush towards Epping, Hainault or Woodford via Newbury Park |
Former route
| North Acton towards Ealing Broadway or West Ruislip | Central line | Wood Lane towards Epping, Hainault or Woodford via Newbury Park |
