= Harry Bell Measures =

British architect (1862–1940)

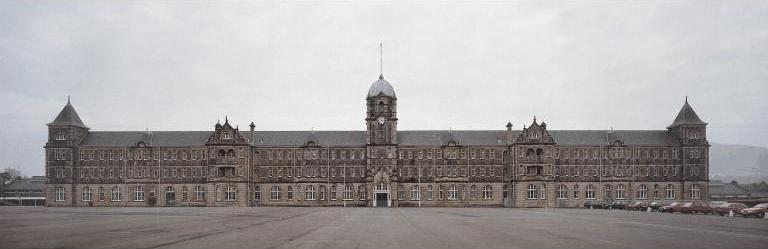
Redford Cavalry Barracks, Edinburgh

Harry Bell Measures CBE MVO (1862–1940) was an English architect.

== Career ==
He had a varied career. In 1884 to 1892 he was in-house architect for William Willett, producing high-quality housing for the wealthy in London and South East England; these were normally in the ornate red-brick Queen Anne style popular at the time. The buildings designed included 69 – 79 The Drive, Hove, built in 1887.

He was also responsible for a number of English "improved" working class housing developments, such as the Rowton Houses in London and Birmingham. He designed the original station buildings for the Central London Railway (CLR), now the Central line of the London Underground, which opened on 30 July 1900.

He was later the Director of Barrack Construction for the British War Office and was responsible for buildings such as Redford Barracks in Edinburgh, the new cordite incorporating houses at the Waltham Abbey Royal Gunpowder Mills and New Building, Royal Military Academy Sandhurst. Measures was appointed a Commander of the Order of the British Empire (CBE) in the 1918 New Year Honours for his work on barrack design.

Measures is the paternal great-grandfather of the author, Christopher Joll.

== Other works ==
- Houses for Willett & Sons at Lyndhurst Gardens (1886), Hampstead
- Houses for Willett & Sons at Eaton Avenue (1890), Hampstead
- Works for Artizans, Labourers & General Dwellings Company on Leigham Court Estate, Streatham.
- Union Jack Club, London, 1907 King Edward VII opened the club and appointed Measures a Member 4th Class of the Royal Victorian Order (MVO) for the work. The building was badly damaged in the Blitz and demolished in 1970.

== Central London Railway ==
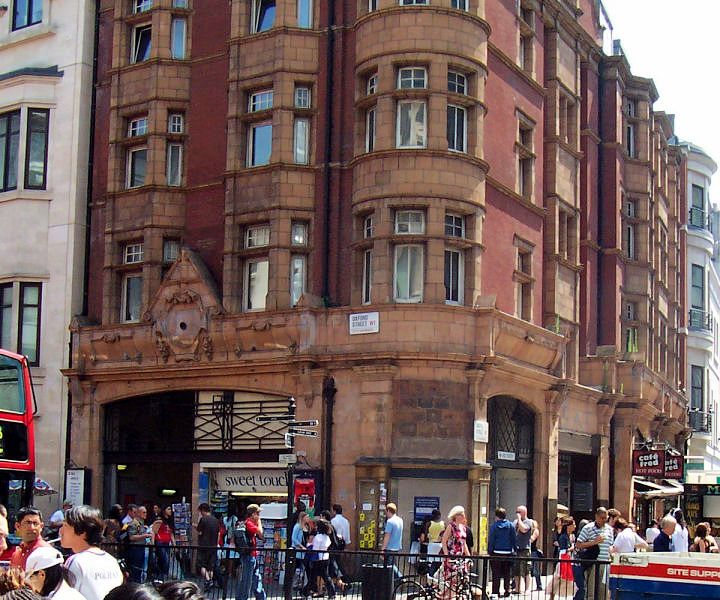
Measures-designed entrance to Oxford Circus station.

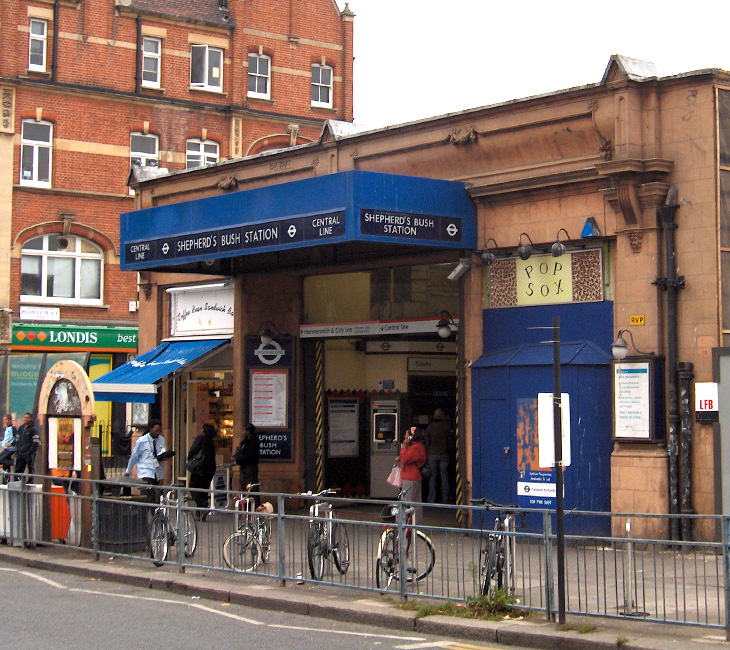
Measures' original 1900 Shepherd's Bush station building (demolished 2008)

Measures was responsible for a number of buildings on the original section of the CLR, many of which survive today as London Underground stations. He favoured terracotta as a building material, constructing his station buildings using factory-made ceramic blocks. This allowed him to design stylistically consistent structures quite economically. His tunnel platforms were lined with glazed ceramic tiles. Measures' techniques influenced the work of another contemporary Underground station architect, Leslie Green. His 1900 design for Oxford Circus station was a single-storey entrance on the corner of Argyll Street and Oxford Street, clad in pale pink terracotta and decorated in a Mannerist style. Today it is considered to be the best surviving example of Measures-designed station architecture and the entrance, and the building above it, is Grade-II listed. The red ceramic building on the western corner is by Leslie Green.

Measures designed the following stations on the CLR:

- Shepherd's Bush (Central line) – building demolished and rebuilt to a completely different design in 2008.
- Holland Park – station building remains in use
- Notting Hill Gate – building demolished; new sub-surface station constructed
- Queensway – opened as Queens Road. The building remains in use
- Lancaster Gate – building demolished and rebuilt to a different design as part of a tower block development
- Marble Arch – Oxford Street entrance remains, but unrecognisable as a work by Measures
- Bond Street – station rebuilt in 1920s by Charles Holden
- Oxford Circus – the Grade-II-listed CLR building to the east of Argyll Street is a well-preserved example
- Tottenham Court Road – opened as Oxford Street. Not recognisable as a work by Measures when demolished in 2009.
- British Museum – station closed in 1933 when new Central line platforms opened at Holborn. Demolished in the 1990s.
- Chancery Lane – High Holborn station building remains but no longer used for access to the station
- St Paul's – opened as Post Office. Demolished in the 1930s
- Bank – no surface building

Measures designed the CLR's Wood Lane Power Station (now known as the Dimco Buildings), which is Grade II listed. He also designed the original station building for the railway's Wood Lane station, which opened in 1908 for the Franco-British Exhibition, although this was later modified to a design by Stanley Heaps. The station was closed in 1947 and the building has been demolished.
