= Wood Lane tube station (Central line) =

Former railway station in England

Wood Lane
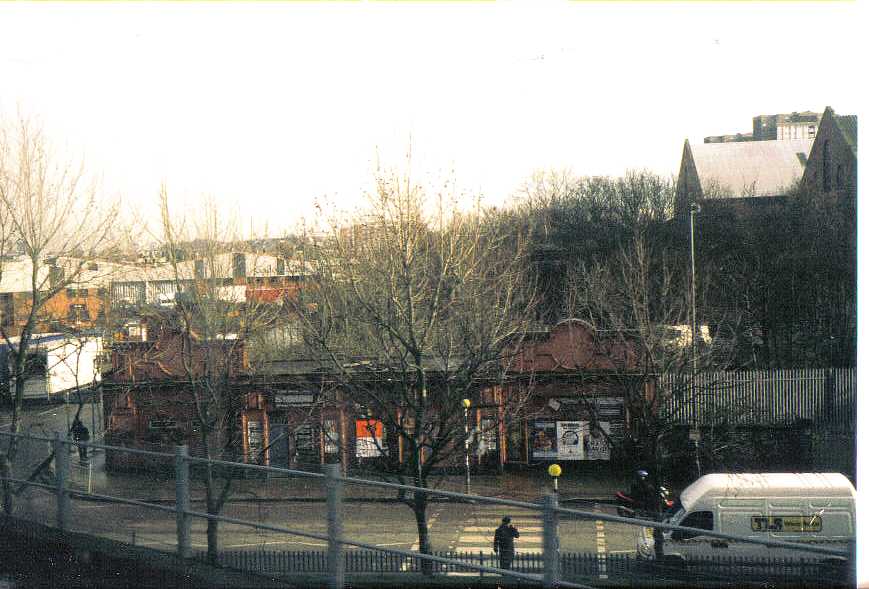
- The remains of the station pictured in 2001
- Interactive map of Wood Lane

General information
- Location: Shepherd's Bush
- Owner: Central London Railway
- Number of platforms: 4

Key dates
- 1908: Opened
- 1947: Closed
- Replaced by: White City

Other information
- Coordinates: 51°30′32.81″N 0°13′27.7″W

Wood Lane is a former station on the London Underground located in Shepherd's Bush, west London. It was latterly served by the Central line and from 1908 to 1920 was the western terminus of the Central line's precursor, the Central London Railway (CLR).

Wood Lane station was built to serve the 1908 Franco-British Exhibition and the 1908 Olympic Games. Its location was very confined and its configuration awkward, requiring alterations on a number of occasions to meet operational requirements.

It closed in 1947 following the opening of the nearby White City station. In 2008, a new Wood Lane station was opened nearby on the Circle and Hammersmith & City lines.

== History ==
=== Wood Lane depot ===
Prior to the 1908 Franco-British Exhibition, the western terminus of the Central London Railway (CLR) was at Shepherd's Bush. North of Shepherd's Bush were the CLR's power station and Wood Lane depot. Trains originally accessed the depot via a single, sharply-curved tunnel from the station's westbound platform, heading northwards under Caxton Street. Trains then exited the tunnel to the north of the depot and used a reversing siding to run into the depot in a southbound direction. Trains running from the depot reversed the process and entered the eastbound platform of Shepherd's Bush station via a junction to the west of the station.

=== Temporary exhibition station ===
A diagram of stations in the Shepherd's Bush area, including Wood Lane station

When the exhibition opened, a temporary station was constructed within the northern perimeter of the depot on the site of the reversing siding. A new tunnel was bored to connect directly to the end of the eastbound tunnel at Shepherd's Bush station, forming a loop.

As constructed for the exhibition, Wood Lane station had just a single track with platforms on each side: one for loading and the other for unloading. Trains entered the station anti-clockwise in a westbound direction from the tunnel under the depot, and exited heading south back into the tunnel in the direction of Shepherd's Bush station.

Following the success of the exhibition a number of other entertainment venues, notably White City Stadium, grew up in the area and the temporary station at Wood Lane became a permanent fixture.

=== Permanent station expansion ===
Wood Lane became the western terminus of the CLR. Until the late 1920s, the railway used carriages that were accessed by gated entrances at the carriage ends. When new rolling stock was introduced with sliding pneumatic doors, Wood Lane's loop platforms had to be extended to provide access to all doors but it was not possible to extend the platform on the inside of the loop (the south side) as it interfered with an access track to the depot. A pivoting section of platform was constructed that could be moved to allow access to the depot to be made when required.

CLR services began to operate to Ealing Broadway from August 1920 and Wood Lane was reconfigured to accommodate through-running from Ealing Broadway to the West End of London and the City of London, thereby losing its terminus status.

A new sub-surface tunnel was constructed to the north of the existing loop platforms on which was located a new westbound platform for trains heading to Ealing Broadway. Another new sub-surface tunnel was constructed to the west (and below) the loop platforms, providing an eastbound platform for trains from Ealing Broadway. Trains terminating or starting at Wood Lane continued to use the loop platforms. The station thus had a triangular shape.

=== Closure ===
Due to its awkward configuration and unsatisfactory operation, Wood Lane was closed in 1947 when a replacement station called White City was opened on the Central line a short distance to the north. Consequent on the awkward layout of Wood Lane, the layout of White City necessitated that the trains run on the right rather than the left as is normal. The tracks swap sides west of White City to facilitate normal running.

The Wood Lane platforms were abandoned and the depot became known as White City depot.

=== Demolition ===
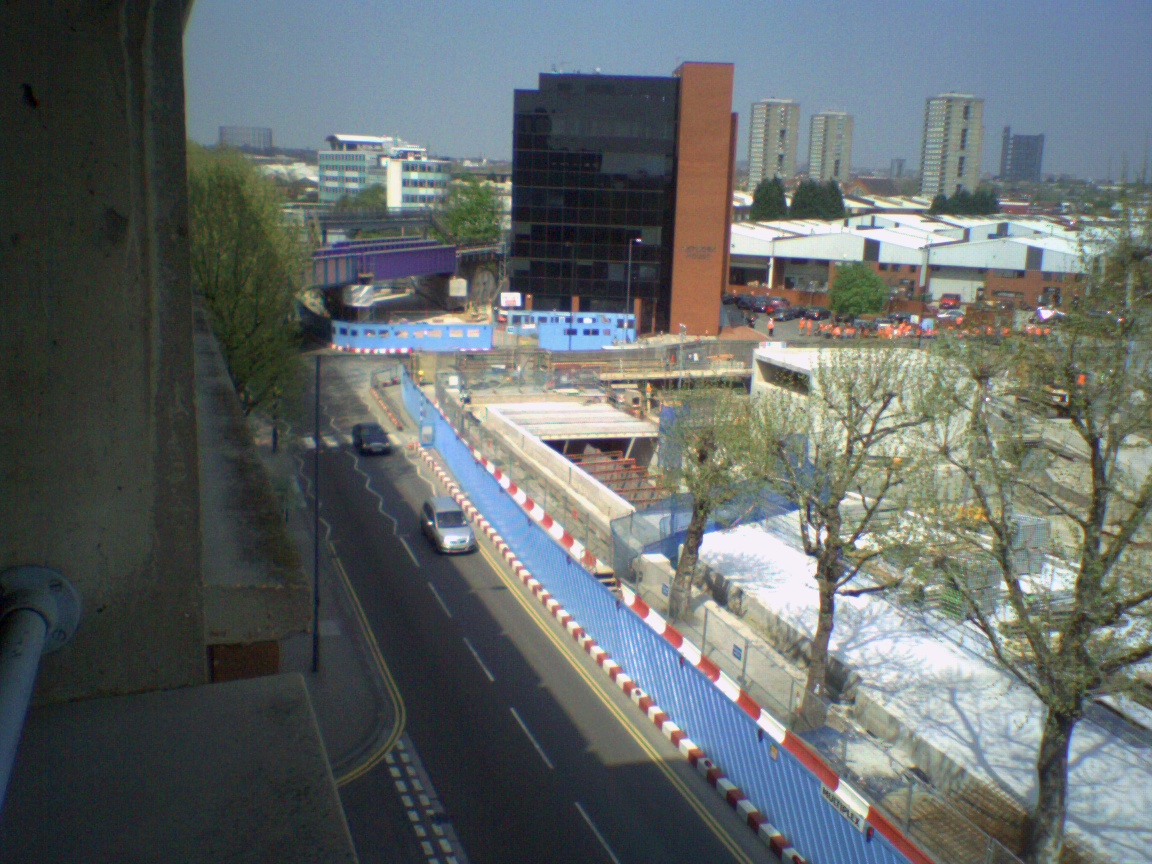
The station site being redeveloped in 2006

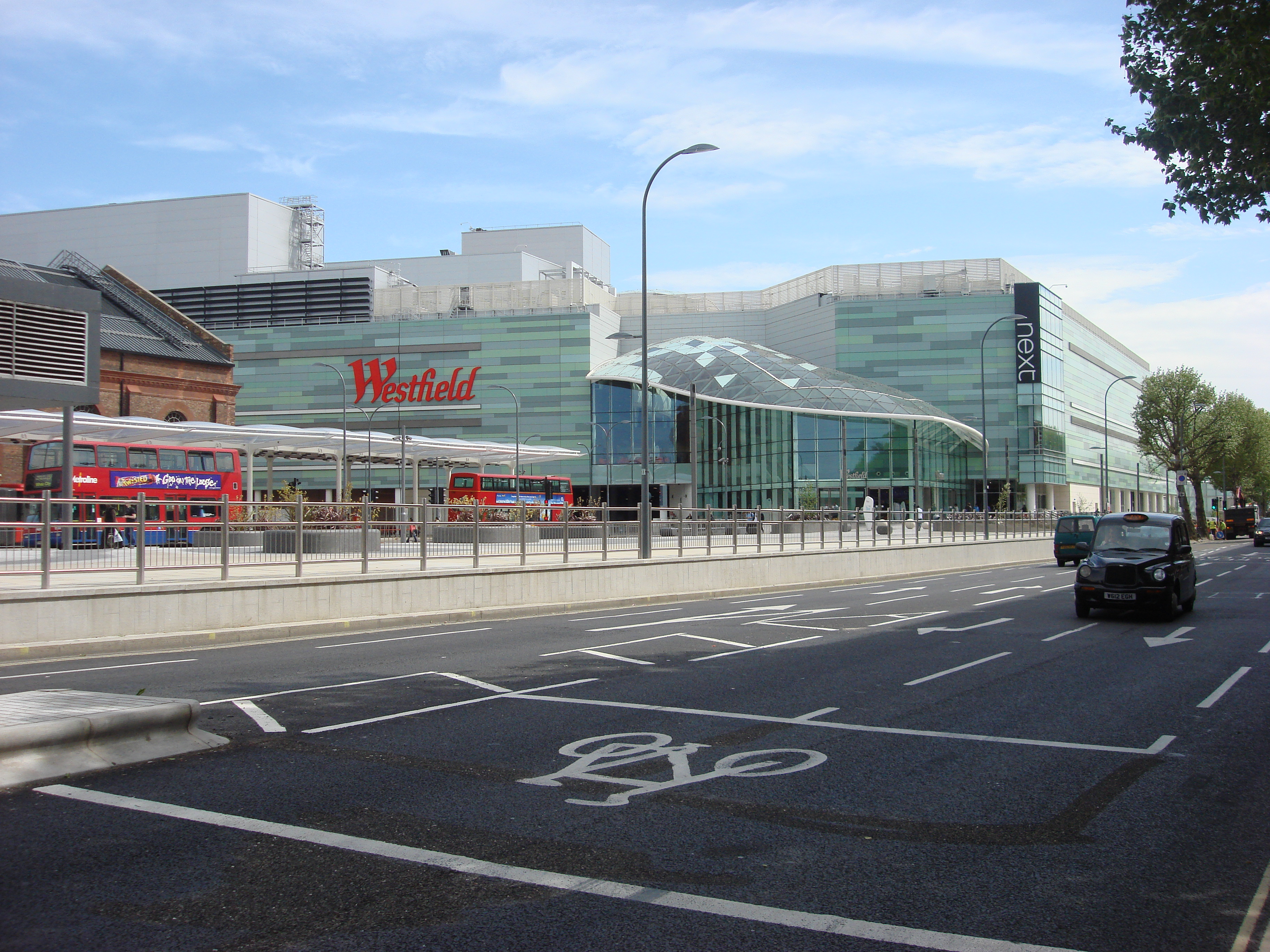
The former site of Wood Lane is now occupied by the Westfield London bus interchange. At left, the brick building is the line's former power station.

Until the station's demolition between 2003 and 2005, the old eastbound platform could still be seen from passing trains heading from White City to Shepherd's Bush and the former eastbound platform was incorporated into the new depot's roads using the single track, which can clearly be seen when leaving White City station when travelling to Shepherd's Bush.

The site of the station and the depot was redeveloped for the Westfield London shopping centre, and in summer 2005 the curving ramps to the original 1908 platforms and the platforms themselves, in the north-west corner of the site, were removed. A new depot was constructed completely below ground, underneath the Westfield London shopping centre.

Elements of the original Wood Lane street level building facade were dismantled and moved to the London Transport Museum's depot in Acton for reconstruction. The restoration works on the roundel pediment were completed by London Underground in 2009. The Underground roundel is now on display at the current Wood Lane station.

== In popular culture ==
In The Tomorrow People's first serial, Slaves of Jedikiah, the outdoor shots of the abandoned station where the lab was located showed it to be Wood Lane. The BBC drama series Survivors used the location in the second season, 1976 episode The Lights of London. Also, the dockland scenes in the Doctor Who serial The Dalek Invasion of Earth were enacted there.

In the 1988 animation movie Who Framed Roger Rabbit directed by Robert Zemeckis, the scenes for the Acme factory were filmed in the former power house (later known as the Dimco Buildings) in the Wood Lane Depot (now part of the Westfield Shopping Centre). It is a Grade II listed building.

Preceding station	London Underground	Following station
Former Route
Shepherd's Bush One-way operation	Central line (1908–1912)	Shepherd's Bush towards Bank
Shepherd's Bush One-way operation	Central line (1912–1920)	Shepherd's Bush towards Liverpool Street
East Acton towards Ealing Broadway	Central line (1920–1946)	Shepherd's Bush towards Liverpool Street
East Acton towards Ealing Broadway	Central line (1946–1947)	Shepherd's Bush towards Stratford
East Acton towards Ealing Broadway or Greenford	Central line (1947–1947)	Shepherd's Bush towards Stratford
East Acton towards Ealing Broadway or Greenford	Central line (1947–1947)	Shepherd's Bush towards Leytonstone
