= Dimco Buildings =

Historic structure in White City, London

Coordinates: 51.5087°N 0.2231°W

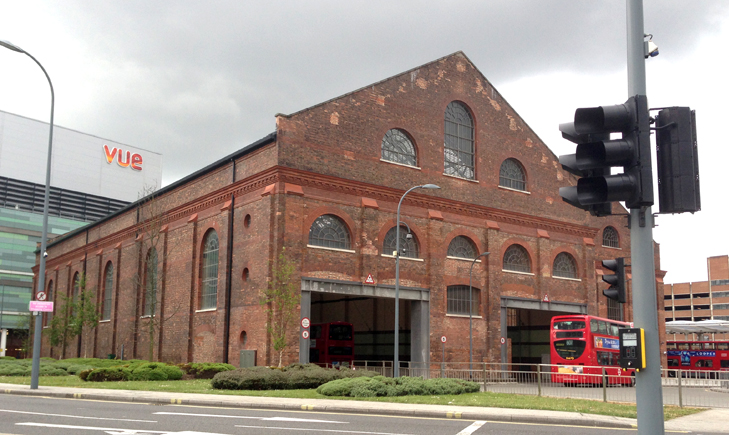
- The Dimco Buildings
- Interactive map of the Dimco Buildings area

General information
- Type: Power Generating Station
- Architectural style: Victorian
- Location: White City, London, England
- Current tenants: London Buses
- Construction started: 1898

Technical details
- Structural system: Timber frame, brick

Design and construction
- Architect: Harry Bell Measures
- Services engineer: Horace Field Parshall

The Dimco Buildings are a pair of 19th-century structures in White City, London, just north of Shepherd's Bush. Originally built in 1898 as an electric railway power station, they are now in use as a bus station.

== History ==
The Dimco Buildings were constructed in 1898 to house an engine house and boiler house for the Wood Lane electricity generating station serving the Wood Lane depot of the Central London Railway (CLR), the precursor of present-day Central line on the London Underground network. The architect was Harry Bell Measures, who was also responsible for a number of station buildings on the original CLR. The power station closed on 18 March 1928 when power for the line began to be supplied from Lots Road Power Station. After closure, the buildings were taken over by Dimco, an Italian machine tools company.

After falling derelict for a number of years, the Dimco Buildings were refurbished in 2007-8 and now house the White City bus station, located next to the Westfield London shopping centre, one of the largest in Europe.

Since 1988, the Dimco Buildings have been Grade II listed for their historic significance as the earliest surviving example of an electricity generating station built for the London Underground.

== In popular culture ==
The Dimco buildings were used as a filming location for the Acme Factory in the 1988 film Who Framed Roger Rabbit, and later served as the interior of the British Museum in The Mummy Returns (2001). British girl group Girls Aloud also filmed the music video for their debut single "Sound of the Underground" in the Dimco Building on 2 December 2002, just two days after they had been formed on Popstars: The Rivals.

== See also ==
- History of Shepherd's Bush
