= London Buses route 31 =

London bus route

31
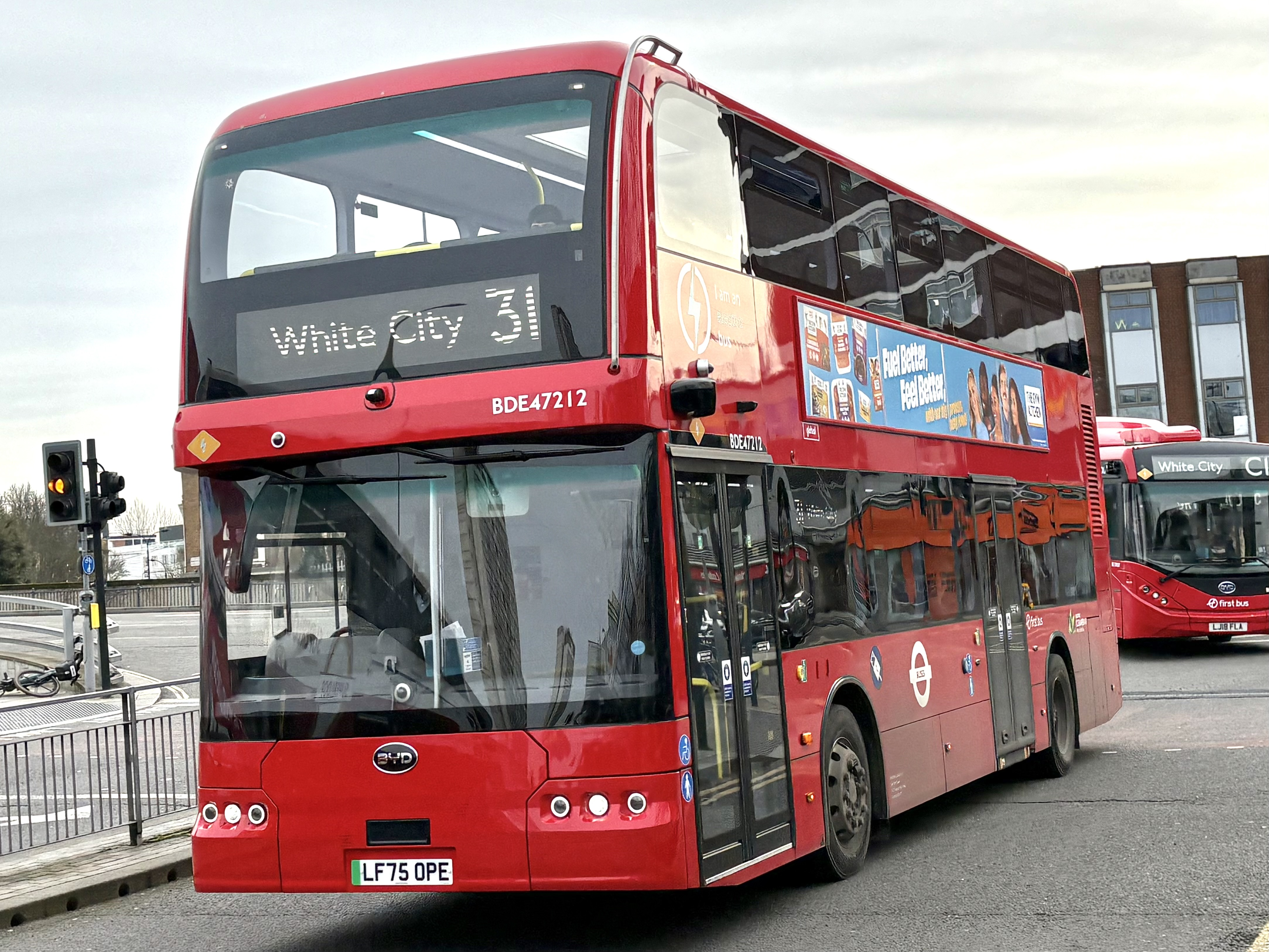
- London Transit BYD BD11B at Shepherd's Bush station in February 2026

Overview
- Operator: London Transit (First Bus London)
- Garage: Westbourne Park
- Vehicle: BYD BD11B
- Peak vehicle requirement: 15
- Night-time: N28 and N31

Route
- Start: White City bus station
- Via: Notting Hill; Westbourne Park; Maida Hill; Kilburn; Swiss Cottage
- End: Camden Town station
- Length: 6 miles (9.7 km)

Service
- Level: Daily
- Frequency: About every 7–11 minutes
- Journey time: 35-64 minutes
- Operates: 05:00 until 01:00

London Buses route 31 is a Transport for London contracted bus route in London, England. Running between White City bus station and Camden Town station, it is operated by First Bus London subsidiary London Transit.

== History ==
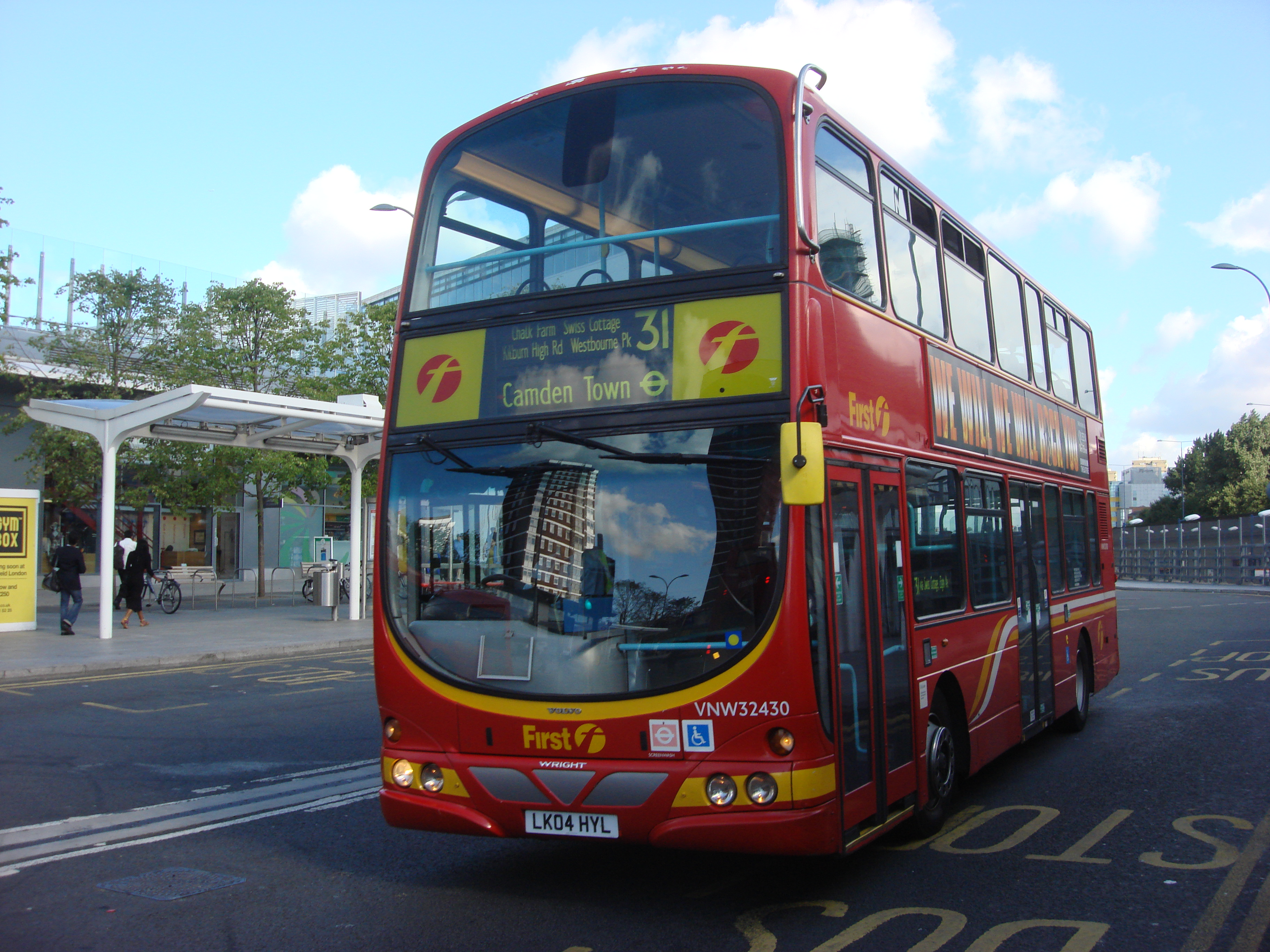
First London Volvo B7TL Wright Eclipse Gemini in August 2010

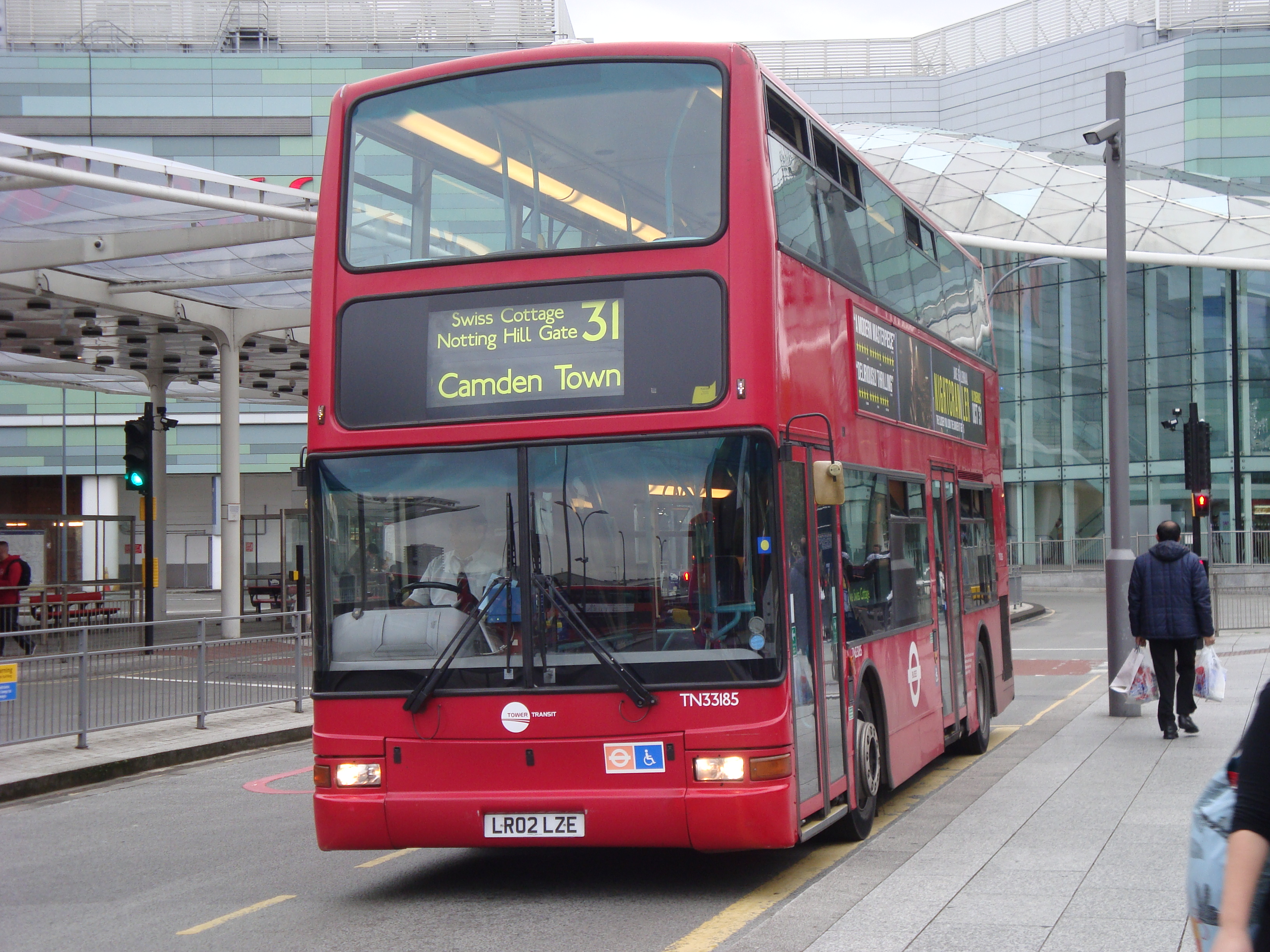
Tower Transit Plaxton President bodied Dennis Trident 2 in October 2014

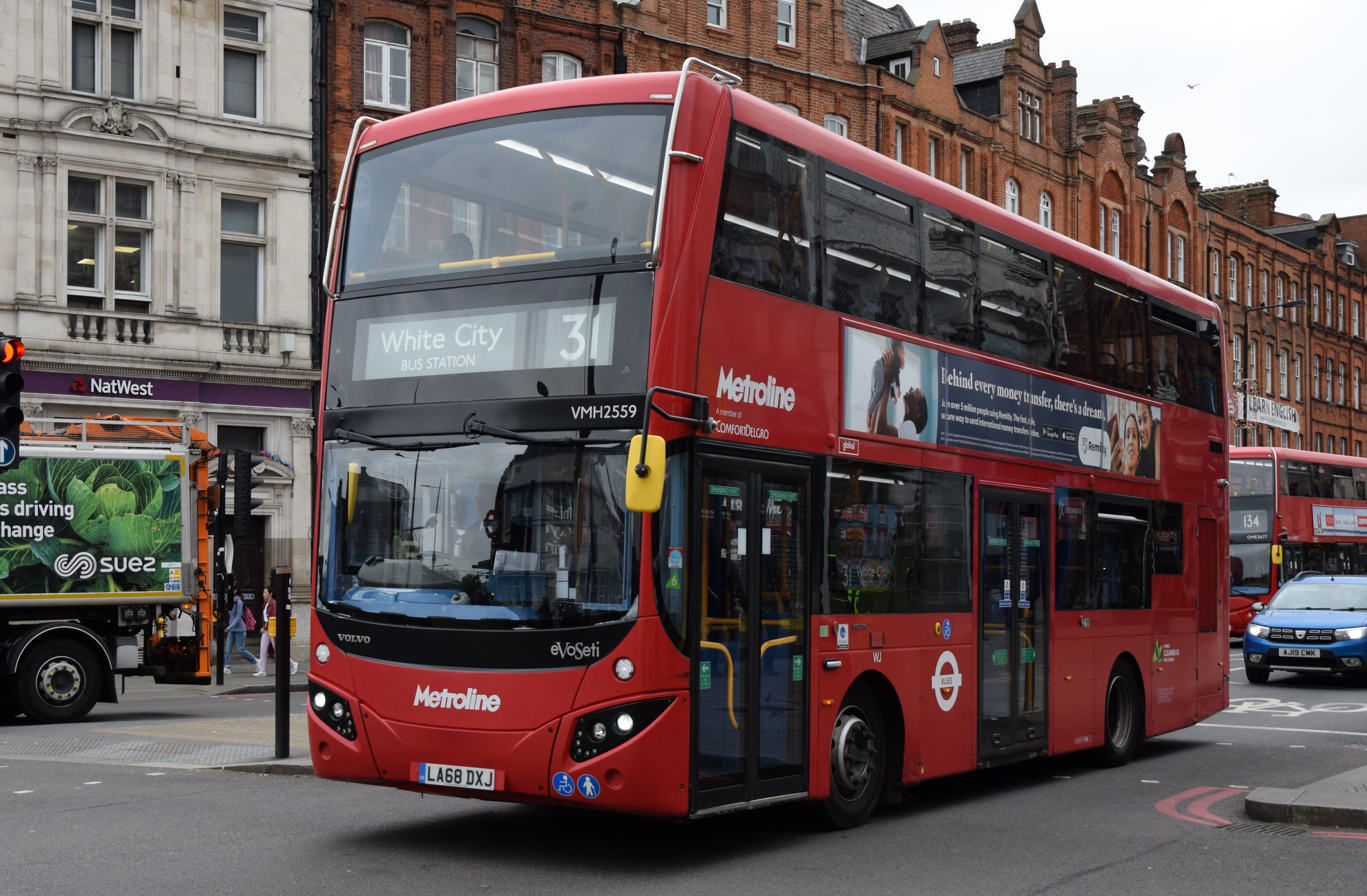
Metroline MCV EvoSeti bodied Volvo B5LH in May 2023

Route 31 commenced operating on 7 September 1911 as a daily route between Chelsea and South Hampstead via Edith Grove, Earls Court Road, Kensington High Street, Notting Hill Gate, Great Western Road, Walterton Road and Belsize Road, replacing horse-drawn omnibus route 36, which also ran between Chelsea and Finchley Road.

Three months later, on 7 December 1911, it was further extended to Finchley Road station. From 31 October 1912, it was re-routed at Belsize Road to run to Gospel Oak via Eton Avenue, Englands Lane and Parkhill Avenue instead of to Finchley Road. However, this extension did not last long and in December 1912 route 31 was curtailed to run daily from Chelsea to South Hampstead (Swiss Cottage).

On 15 May 1916, route 31 was extended to run daily from Swiss Cottage to Tulse Hill via Adelaide Road, Camden Town, Eversholt Street, Russell Square, Southampton Row, Kingsway, Aldwych, Waterloo Bridge, Elephant & Castle, Camberwell Green, Denmark Hill and Herne Hill, replacing route 68, which was withdrawn on the same day. The operation of this long, horseshoe-shaped route between Chelsea and Tulse Hill lasted for one year; after 29 April 1917 route 31 was withdrawn between Camden Town and Tulse Hill, with route 68 being reintroduced to replace it.

From 21 November 1987, the Sunday service was converted to one-person operation, and this was extended to daily operation from 15 April 1989, when was converted to minibus operation with AEC Routemasters replaced by 28-seat Alexander bodied Mercedes-Benz midibuses. In 1988, Gold Arrow routes 28 and 31 were introduced, operated by CentreWest.

These vehicles were quickly found to be too small, and were replaced with Dennis Darts three years later. On 29 May 1999, the route was withdrawn between Notting Hill Gate and Chelsea and replaced by new route 328. Double-deck operation was reintroduced with low-floor Volvo B7TLs in 2004; there was no reduction in frequency.

On 2 December 2006, the route was extended to Shepherd's Bush Green in preparation for the western extension of the congestion charge. A further short extension took place on 29 November 2008, when the route was extended to White City bus station to coincide with the opening of Westfield London. Although route 31 was extended in connection with the Western extension of the congestion charging zone, after the congestion charge was removed, the extension has remained. However, TfL has also committed to a review of bus services, including those in the Western extension zone.

On 22 June 2013, route 31 was included in the sale of First London's Atlas Road garage to Tower Transit. On 28 April 2018, Metroline started operating the route using existing Wright Eclipse Gemini 2 bodied Volvo B9TLs from Perivale West garage. On 5 March 2022, the allocation was transferred to Willesden Junction garage using existing MCV EvoSeti bodied Volvo B5LHs. The route's allocation was transferred to Holloway garage on 4 May 2024.

On 26 April 2025, First Bus London began operating the route as it returned to Westbourne Park garage.

== Current route ==
Route 31 operates via these primary locations:

- White City bus station for Wood Lane station
- Shepherd's Bush stations
- Royal Crescent
- Holland Park station
- Notting Hill Gate station
- Westbourne Park station
- Maida Hill The Chippenham
- Kilburn Park station
- Kilburn High Road station
- South Hampstead station
- Swiss Cottage station
- Chalk Farm station
- Camden Town station

== Popular culture ==
The route was the subject of the 1985 BBC documentary film To the World's End: Scenes and Characters on a London Bus Route, which followed the route from Camden Town to The World's End, Chelsea, meeting various people who live or work along the route and featuring a score by Carl Davis. The film can be viewed online as part of the BBC Four Collection series of archive programmes made available on BBC iPlayer.
