= Holland Park tube station =

London Underground station

Holland Park
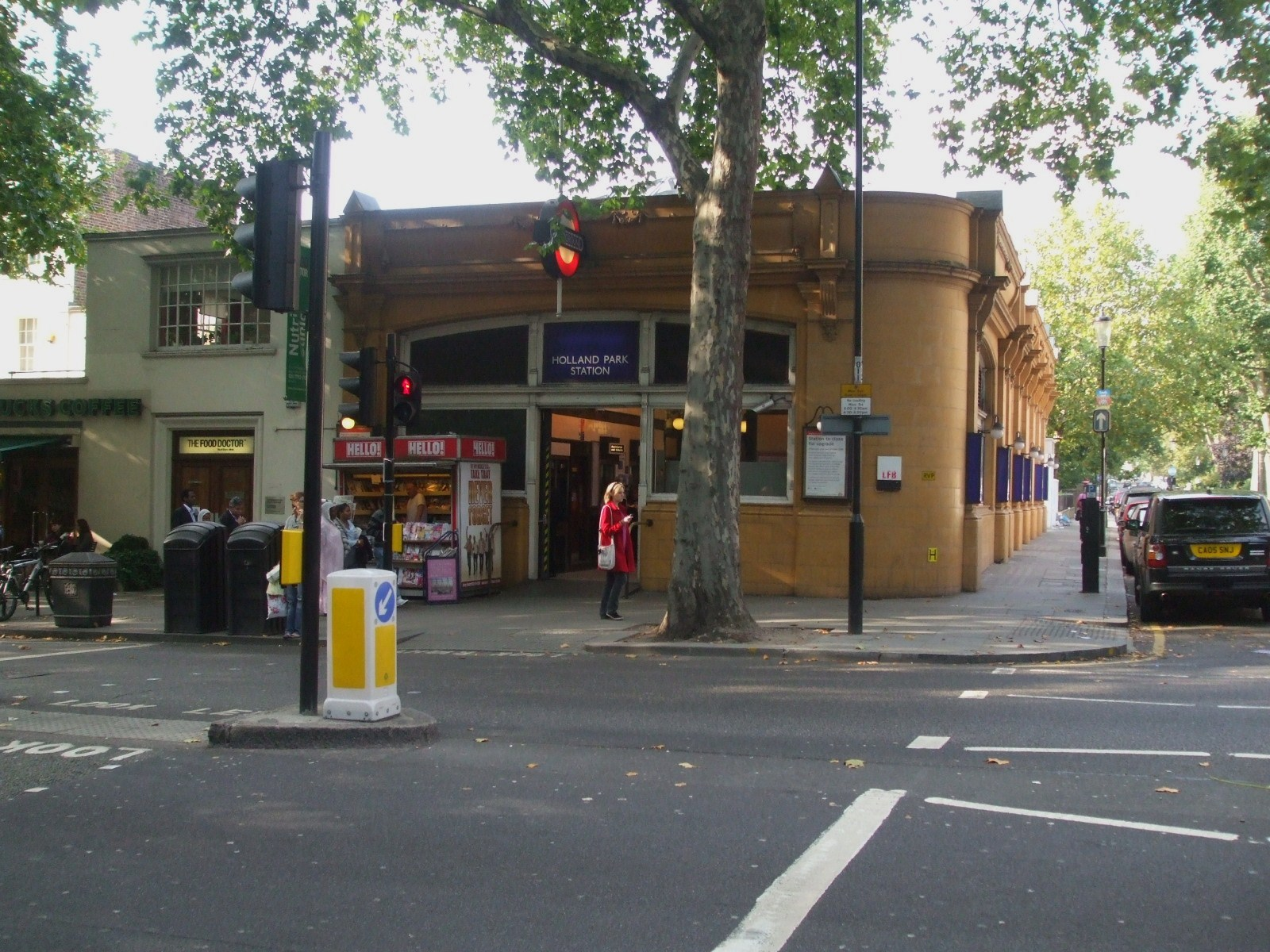
- Station building
- Interactive map of Holland Park

General information
- Location: Holland Park
- Local authority: Royal Borough of Kensington and Chelsea
- Managed by: London Underground
- Number of platforms: 2
- Fare zone: 2

London Underground annual entry and exit
- 2020: ▼1.99 million
- 2021: ▼1.62 million
- 2022: ▲2.65 million
- 2023: ▼2.62 million
- 2024: ▲2.95 million

Key dates
- 30 July 1900: Opened

Other information
- External links: TfL station info page
- Coordinates: 51.5072°N 0.2056°W

Holland Park is a London Underground station, located on Holland Park Avenue. It is on the Central line, between Shepherd's Bush and Notting Hill Gate stations. It is in London fare zone 2.

== History ==
The original building was typical of those designed by Harry Bell Measures for the stations of the Central London Railway that opened on 30 July 1900. It was given a flat roof in the hope that commercial development would take place on top, as at Queensway station, but so far this has not happened. The building was refurbished in the 1990s.

On 28 July 1958 one passenger died as a result of a fire on a Central line train at Holland Park. There was an incident in August 2013 in which smoke started to fill the station after a train's brakes malfunctioned.

== The station today ==
The tube station is named after Holland Park, a park in west London, although the term also refers to the residential area to the north of the park.

The station was closed for lift replacement works and refurbishment from 2 January 2016 until it reopened in August of the same year. This station was the last of the deep level underground stations to retain the original 1950s signage until the refurbishment.

== Connections ==
London Buses routes 31, 94, 148, 228 and N207 serve the station.

Preceding station	London Underground	Following station
Shepherd's Bush towards Ealing Broadway or West Ruislip	Central line	Notting Hill Gate towards Epping, Hainault or Woodford via Newbury Park
