= London Underground carriages =

Railway rolling stock

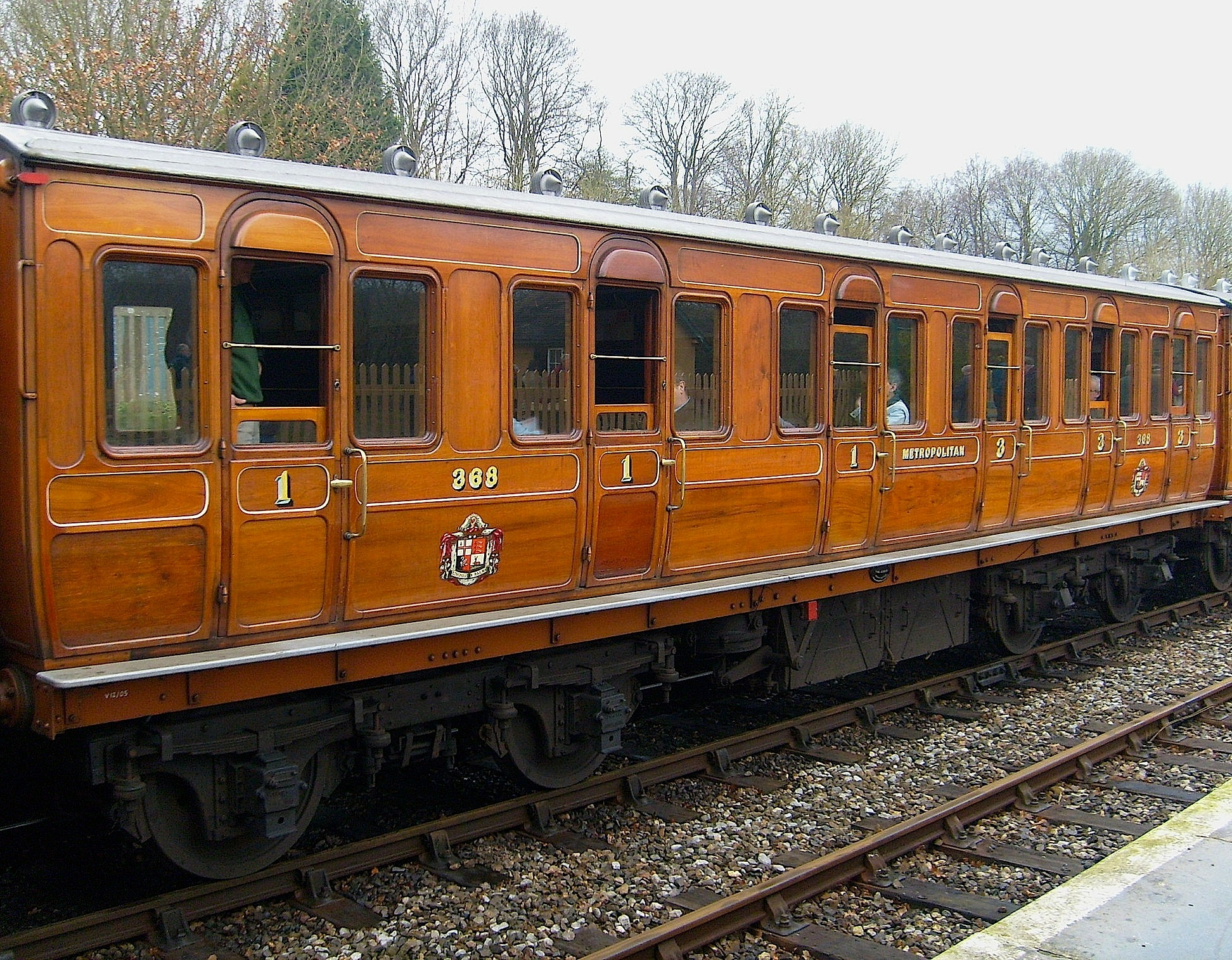
- No. 368 bogie stock built by Ashbury in 1898, as restored at the Bluebell Railway

The London Underground opened in 1863 with gas-lit wooden carriages hauled by steam locomotives. The Metropolitan and District railways both used carriages exclusively until they electrified in the early 20th century. The District railway replaced all its carriages for electric multiple units, whereas the Metropolitan still used carriages on the outer suburban routes where an electric locomotive at the Baker Street end was exchanged for a steam locomotive en route.

The City and South London Railway tube railway opened in 1890 with electric locomotives hauling three carriages. Originally only provided with small windows, these were soon nicknamed "padded cells". These were replaced with standard tube stock when the line was rebuilt in 1923. The Central London Railway briefly used carriages when it opened in 1900, but these were reformed into multiple units in 1902–03.

"Dreadnought" carriages were introduced on the Metropolitan main line in 1910, and these conveyed passengers until replaced by A Stock multiple units in the early 1960s.

== Metropolitan Railway ==
When the Metropolitan Railway opened in 1863 it had no stock of its own but first the Great Western Railway (GWR) and then the Great Northern Railway providing services. The GWR used eight-wheeled compartment carriages constructed from teak. By 1864, the Met had taken delivery of its own stock, made by the Ashbury Railway Carriage & Iron Co., based on the GWR design but standard gauge. Lighting was provided by gas – two jets in first class compartments and one in second and third class compartments, and from 1877 a pressurised oil gas system was used. Initially the carriages were braked with wooden blocks operated by hand from the guards' compartments at the front and back of the train, giving off a distinctive smell. This was replaced in 1869 by a chain which operated brakes on all carriages. The operation of the chain brake could be abrupt, leading to some passenger injuries, and it was replaced by a non-automatic vacuum brake by 1876. In the 1890s, a mechanical 'next station' indicator was tested in some carriages on circle services; triggered by a wooden flap between the tracks. It was considered unreliable and not approved for full installation.

In 1870, some close-coupled rigid-wheelbase four-wheeled carriages were made by Oldburys. After some derailments in 1887, a new design of 27 feet 6 inches (8.38 m) long rigid-wheelbase four-wheelers known as Jubilee Stock was built by the Cravens Railway Carriage and Wagon Co. for the extension line. Fitted with the pressurised gas lighting system and non-automatic vacuum brakes from new, steam heating was added later. More trains followed in 1892, although all had been withdrawn by 1912. By May 1893, following an order by the Board of Trade, automatic vacuum brakes had been fitted to all carriages and locomotives. Bogie stock was made by Ashbury in 1898 and by Cravens and the Met's Neasden Works in 1900. This gave a better ride quality, steam heating, automatic vacuum brakes, electric lighting and upholstered seating in all classes.

== District Railway ==
The steam carriages were four-wheeled, 29 feet 2 inches (8.89 m) long over the buffers. First, second and third class compartments were available. First class carriages had four compartments, the others five. Lighting was initially provided by burning coal gas held in bags on the roof, later by a pressurised oil gas system. At first they were fitted with a chain brake. This was replaced by the simple Westinghouse brake and then a fully automatic Westinghouse brake. Initially trains were made up of eight carriages, but after 1879 nine became the standard. At the end of 1905 the District replaced 395 carriages with electric multiple units.

== Tube railways ==
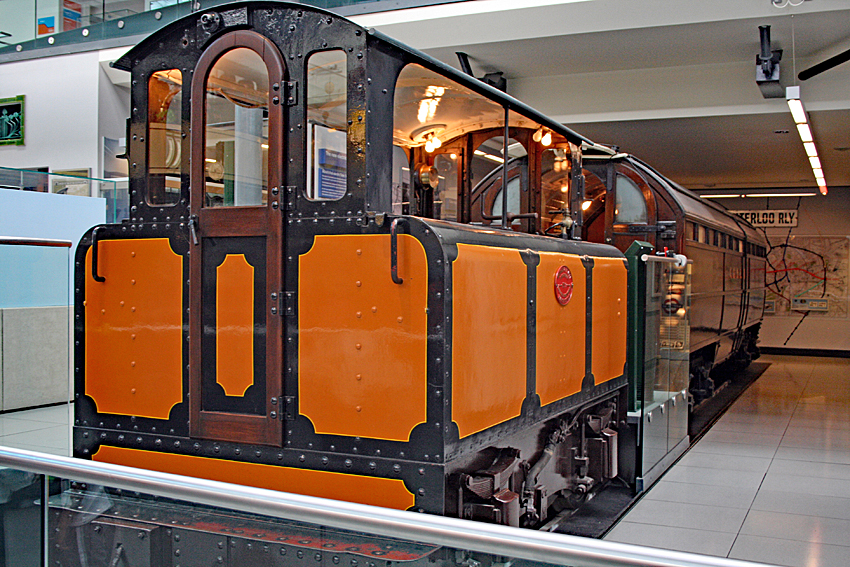
C&SLR electric loco and "padded cell" car

The City and South London Railway tube opened in 1890 with electric locomotives hauling carriages. Initially the locomotive could haul three carriages at an average 13 1/2 miles per hour (21.7 km/h); the trains were air braked, the reservoirs on the locomotives topped up at Stockwell. Thirty 26 feet (7.9 m) carriages seated 32 passengers on longitudinal benches, although it was reported that 80 passengers could be carried. Soon named "padded cells", the carriages were provided with electric lighting. Sliding doors at each end led to a staffed platform with folding gates giving access to the platform. Originally with small windows, later carriages had larger windows and the earlier carriages were modified. In 1923 the railway was closed for reconstruction and tunnel enlargement, and the line reopened using newly built Standard Stock electrical multiple units.

When the Central London Railway opened in 1900, carriages were hauled by electric locomotives. Initially there were 168 vehicles, 45 feet 6 inches (13.87 m) long, with access via sliding doors leading to a gated platform as on the City & South London. Mostly longitudinal seating was provided for 48, together with straps for those standing. In 1902–03 the carriages were reformed into multiple units using a control system developed by Frank J. Sprague in Chicago.

== The Metropolitan after electrification ==
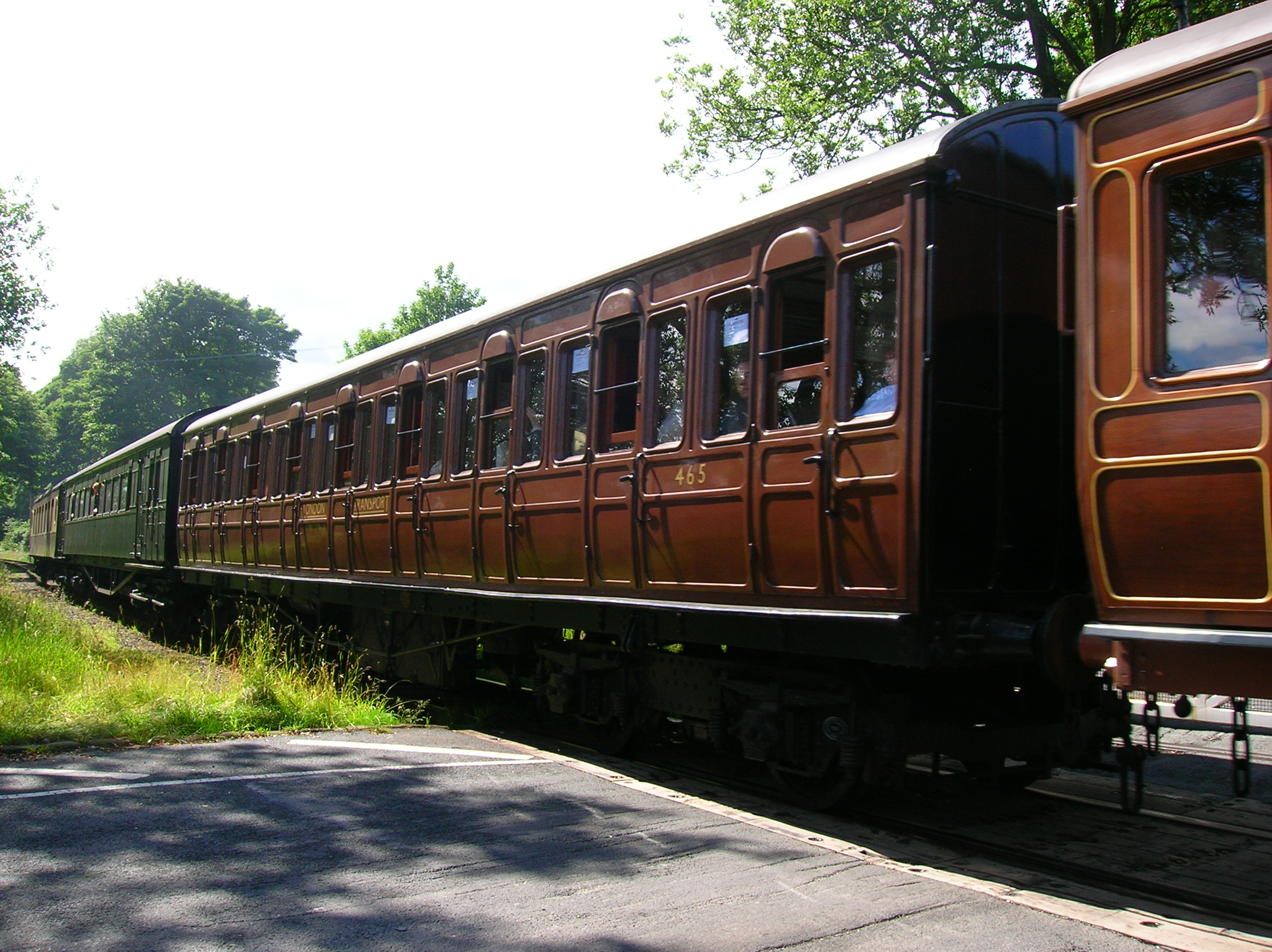
A Metropolitan Railway Dreadnought coach

Competition with the Great Central Railway on outer suburban services on the extension line saw the introduction of more comfortable Dreadnought Stock carriages from 1910. A total of 92 of these wooden compartment carriages were built, fitted with pressurised gas lighting and steam heating. Electric lighting had replaced the gas by 1917, and electric heaters were added in 1922 to provide warmth when hauled by an electric locomotive. Later formed into rakes of five, six or seven coaches, conductor rail pick-ups on the leading and trailing guard coaches were joined by a bus line and connected to the electric locomotive to help prevent gapping. Two rakes were formed with a Pullman coach that provided a buffet service for a supplementary fare. Named Mayflower and Galatea, each Pullman coach seated up to 19 passengers, and for a supplementary fare of 6d or 1s breakfast, luncheon, tea or supper could be purchased. They contained a toilet and were built with steam heating, electric heating being fitted in 1925.

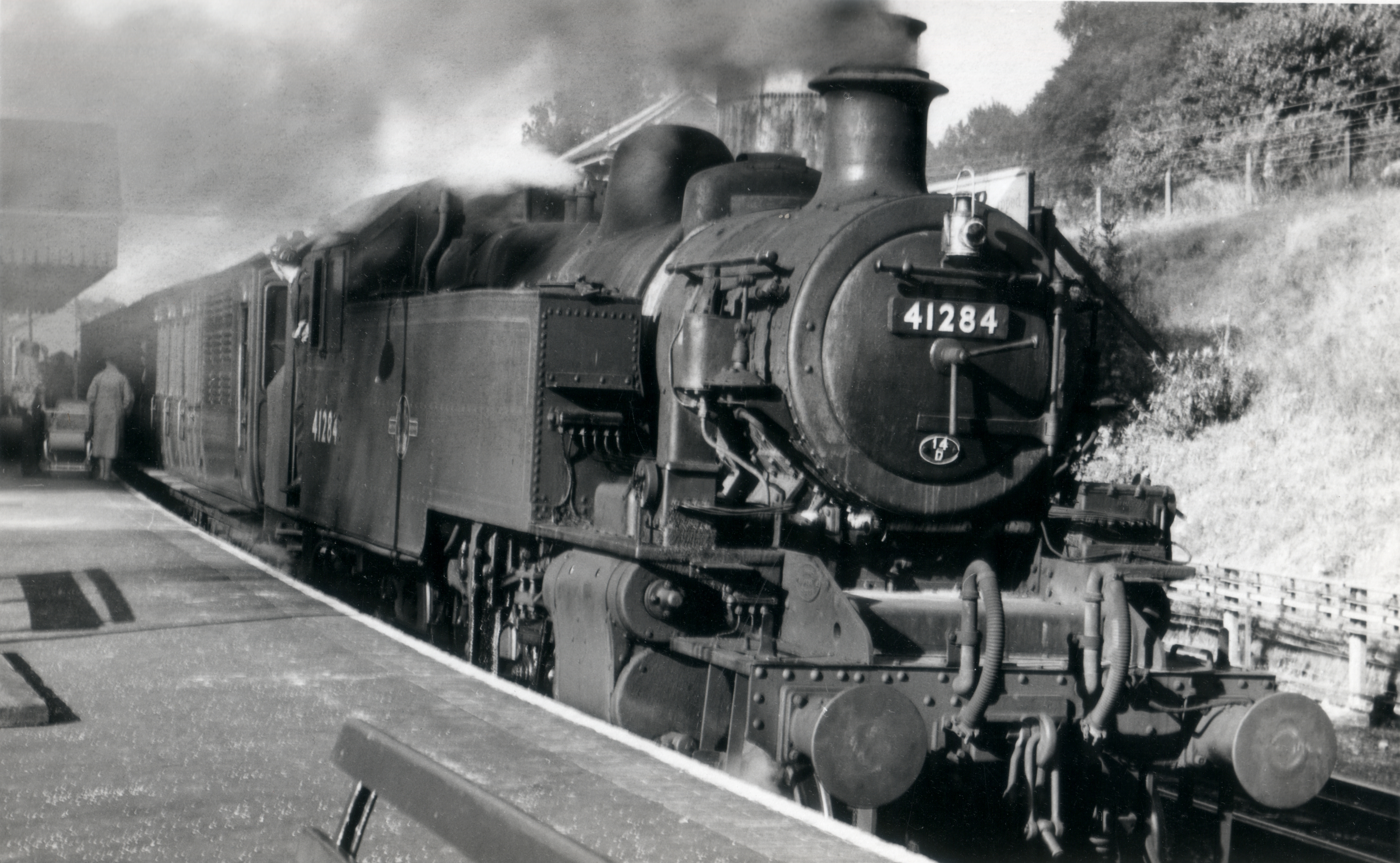
Train of Ashbury stock at Chesham in August 1960

Between 1906 and 1924 the Ashbury bogie stock were converted into electric multiple units, and most were withdrawn in 1939 after the Bakerloo line had been extended to Stanmore. In 1940 the unelectrified Chesham branch was converted to autotrain working, carriages with a steam locomotive attached at one end but capable of being driven from either end, thus avoiding the time-consuming repositioning of the locomotive. LNER C13 Class locomotives were initially used for this push-pull working, along with two three-car sets of bogie stock from the multiple units. The LNER locomotives were later replaced by LMS designed Ivatt 2MT 2-6-2 locomotives. The Pullman coaches were withdrawn early in World War II. Some Dreadnought carriages were used with electric motor cars, although two-thirds remained in use as locomotive-hauled stock on the extension line. The Ashbury bogie stock and the Dreadnought coaches were replaced by A Stock electric multiple units in the early 1960s.

== Preservation ==
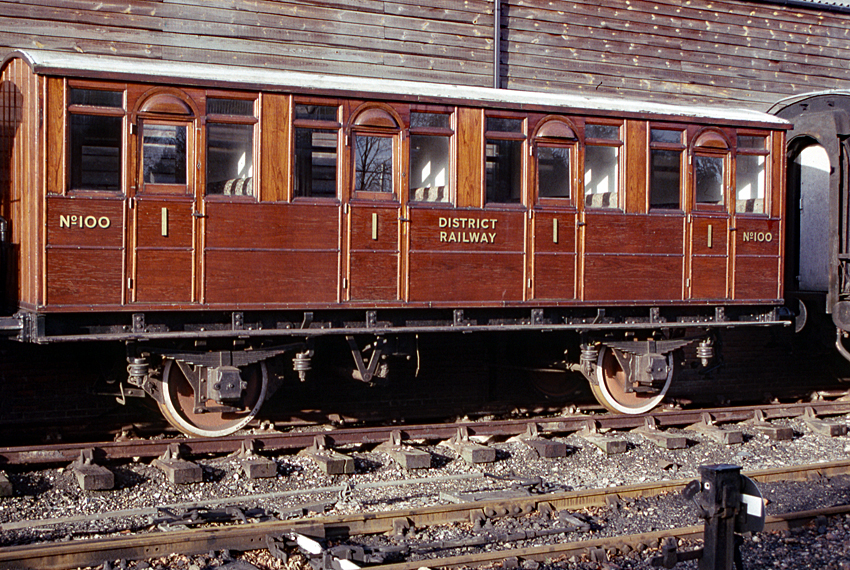
District Railway No 100

A preserved carriage at the Kent and East Sussex Railway was thought to be a District Railway first class, but now thought likely to be a cutdown Metropolitan Railway eight-wheeler. A Jubilee Stock first class carriage was restored to carry passengers in January 2013 during the Met's 150th anniversary celebrations. The Bluebell Railway has four 1898–1900 Ashbury and Cravens carriages, and a fifth, built at Neasden, is at the London Transport Museum. The Vintage Carriages Trust has three preserved Dreadnought carriages.

== See also ==
- Coaching stock — Former-BR coaching stock used for special-services on Metropolitan line
