= Shepherd's Bush tube station =

London Underground station

Shepherd's Bush
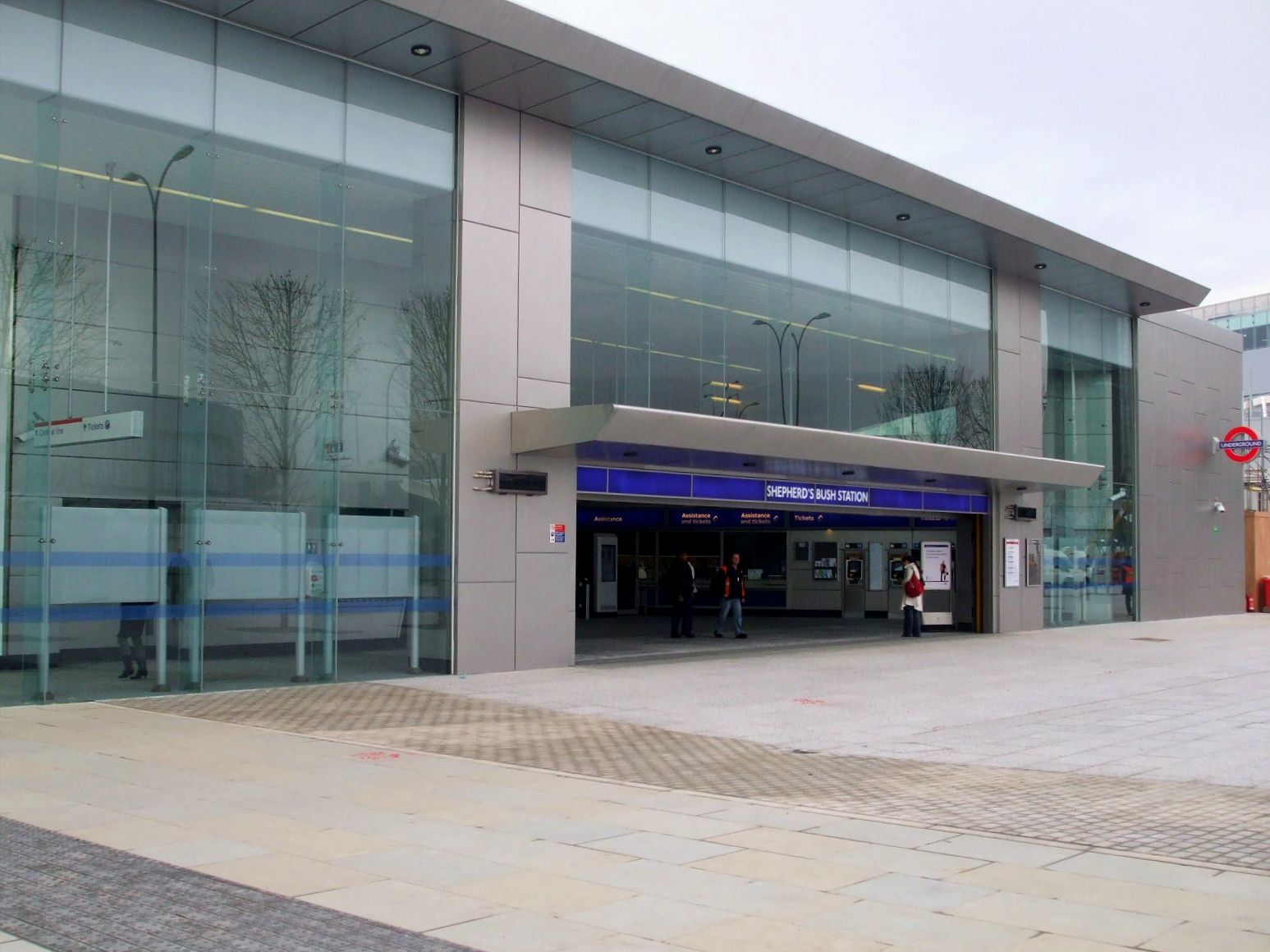
- The new station building opened in 2008
- Interactive map of Shepherd's Bush

General information
- Location: Shepherd's Bush
- Local authority: London Borough of Hammersmith and Fulham
- Managed by: London Underground
- Number of platforms: 2
- Fare zone: 2
- OSI: Shepherd's Bush

London Underground annual entry and exit
- 2020: ▼6.28 million
- 2021: ▲7.58 million
- 2022: ▲13.13 million
- 2023: ▼12.37 million
- 2024: ▲13.25 million

Key dates
- 30 July 1900: Opened as terminus (CLR)
- 14 May 1908: Becomes through station (CLR)

Other information
- External links: TfL station info page
- Coordinates: 51.5044°N 0.2188°W

Shepherd's Bush is a London Underground station. It is located in the district of Shepherd's Bush in the London Borough of Hammersmith and Fulham. The station is on the Central line, between White City and Holland Park stations. It is in London fare zone 2.

The station opened in 1900, but was closed for eight months in 2008 while the surface station building was replaced with a completely new structure and the underground station refurbished. A number of stations in the area both past and present have borne the name Shepherd's Bush; today the Central line station shares its name with the adjacent London Overground's Shepherd's Bush station, with which it shares a surface-level interchange.

An entirely separate London Underground station, Shepherd's Bush Market, served by the Circle and Hammersmith & City lines, is located approximately 1/3-mile (500 m) West. Until 2008, it too was called Shepherd's Bush until it was renamed to avoid confusion.

== History ==
Map showing layout of current and former railways and stations around Shepherd's Bush

The station opened on 30 July 1900 and was the original western terminus of the Central London Railway (CLR). The original surface-level station building was a terracotta-clad ticket hall with its entrance on the Uxbridge Road facing Shepherd's Bush Green. Like all CLR stations, the station building was designed by Harry Bell Measures.

To the north of the station was located the CLR's power station and Wood Lane depot which was originally accessed by a single track tunnel. The eastbound tunnel ended to the west of the station in a dead-end reversing siding with a cross-over junction connecting it to the westbound tunnel. When the now disused Wood Lane station was opened on 14 May 1908 to the north, a loop tunnel was created connecting to the eastbound tunnel.

An extension to Richmond planned in 1920 would have started here with the next stop at the closed London and South Western Railway station at Hammersmith (Grove Road); the work was never carried out. As part of London Transport's New Works Programme, 1935 - 1940, escalators were installed to replace the original lifts and in 1938, the platforms were lengthened along with those of the other existing Central line stations to accommodate eight cars instead of the previous seven.

Some of the original 1900 features of the station were preserved in areas that are not open to the public. Since 2022, London Transport Museum has been running guided historical tours of the station through its "Hidden London" programme, which take visitors to the disused original station corridors and lift shafts to look at the history of the site.

== Westfield redevelopment ==
A large-scale redevelopment began in 2005 to redevelop the White City area to the north of Shepherd's Bush Green and to construct the Westfield Shopping Centre. As part of this project, Shepherd's Bush Central line station was reconstructed in 2008 by Westfield as part of a Section 106 contribution. The Westfield redevelopment also included the construction of an integrated bus interchange and the new London Overground Shepherd's Bush station on the West London line. The new Overground station opened on 28 September that year and is close to the site of the former Uxbridge Road station which closed in 1940.

During the reconstruction of the Central line station, Transport for London closed the station completely for eight months from 4 February 2008; TfL based their decision on the need to replace the escalators at the same time as rebuilding work. This decision caused local controversy, and critics claimed that the works had been timed to benefit incoming businesses involved in the planned redevelopment of the area, at the cost of local residents and small business holders. The local MP for the Shepherd's Bush constituency, Andy Slaughter, investigated the project and obtained documents under the Freedom of Information Act which showed that the contractor, Metronet, had advised that the work could be completed without closing the station. Shepherd's Bush station re-opened to passengers on 5 October that year.

During the refurbishment, Transport for London did not add lifts to the station as originally planned, citing installation costs of £100 million due to the various underground utilities nearby which would have to be diverted. The London Borough of Hammersmith and Fulham and disability pressure groups have been critical of the fact that the station remains inaccessible for those unable to use stairs.

== Connections ==
- Shepherd's Bush station is an OSI for London Overground and National Rail
- London Buses routes 31, 49, 72, 94, 95, 148, 207, 220, 228, 237, 260, 272, 283, 295, 316, C1 and SL8 and night routes N72 and N207 serve the station.

== See also ==
- Shepherd's Bush stations

Preceding station	London Underground	Following station
White City towards Ealing Broadway or West Ruislip	Central line	Holland Park towards Epping, Hainault or Woodford via Newbury Park
Surface-level interchange
Preceding station	London Overground	Following station
Willesden Junction towards Stratford	Mildmay line West London line transfer at Shepherd's Bush	Kensington (Olympia) towards Clapham Junction
Preceding station	National Rail	Following station
Wembley Central towards	Southern West London Route transfer at Shepherd's Bush	Kensington (Olympia) towards
Former Routes
Preceding station	London Underground	Following station
Terminus	Central line (1900-1908)	Holland Park towards Bank
Wood Lane towards Bank	Central line (1908-1912)	Holland Park towards Bank
Wood Lane towards Liverpool Street	Central line (1912-1920)	Holland Park towards Liverpool Street
Wood Lane towards Ealing Broadway	Central line (1920-1946)	Holland Park towards Liverpool Street
Wood Lane towards Ealing Broadway	Central line (1946-1947)	Holland Park towards Stratford
Wood Lane towards Ealing Broadway or Greenford	Central line (1947-1947)	Holland Park towards Stratford
Wood Lane towards Ealing Broadway or Greenford	Central line (1947-1947)	Holland Park towards Leytonstone
Abandoned Plans
Preceding station	London Underground	Following station
The Grove towards Richmond	Central line (1913)	Holland Park towards Liverpool Street
Hammersmith (Grove Road) towards Richmond	Central line (1920)	Holland Park towards Liverpool Street
