= White City bus station =

Bus station in London, England

Coordinates: 51.5087°N 0.2238°W

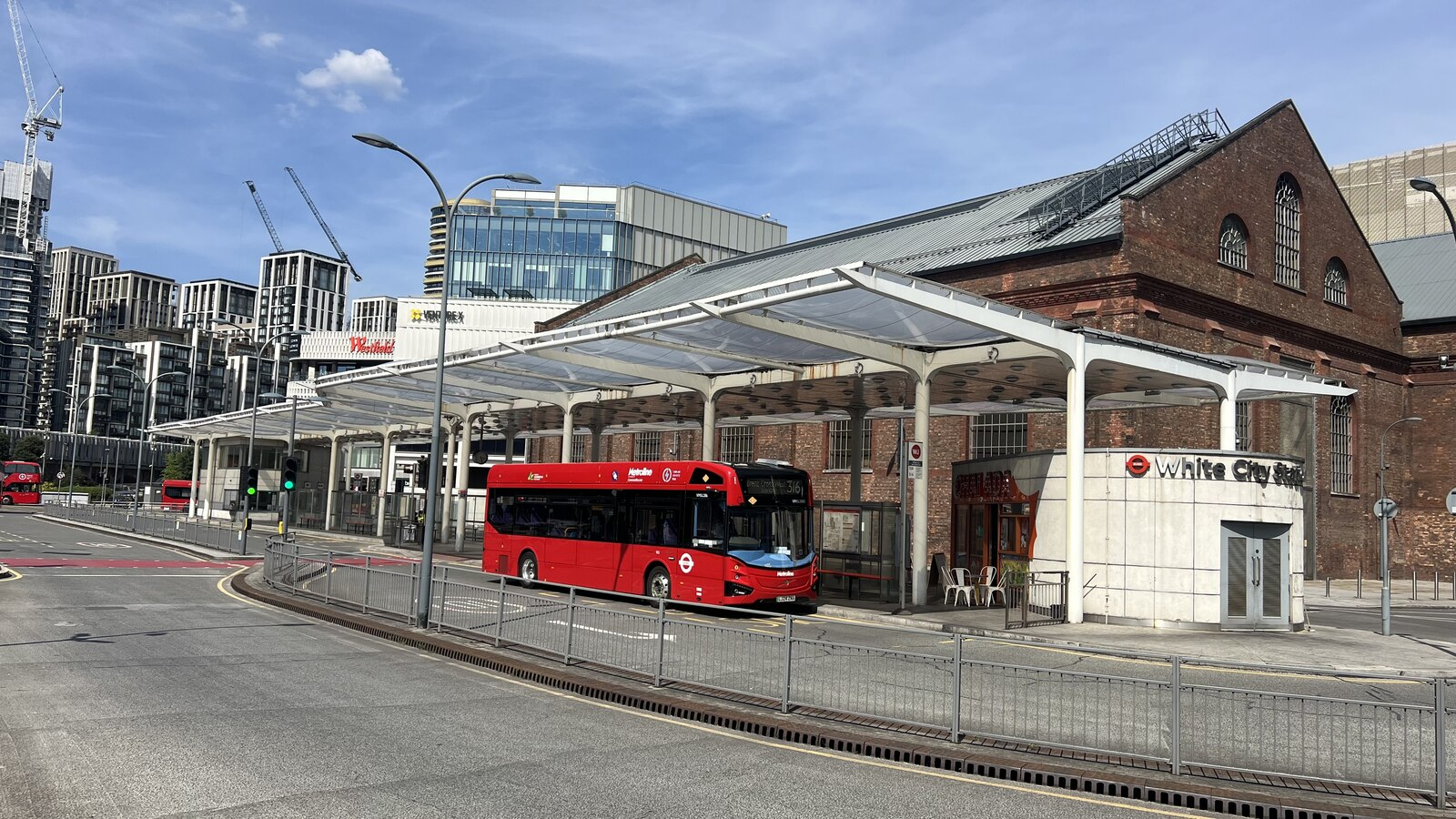
- The bus station in June 2025

General information
- Location: White City, London; England
- Operator: Transport for London
- Bus stands: 2
- Bus operators: Transport UK London Bus; Metroline; RATP Dev Transit London
- Connections: Wood Lane tube station (100 metres [110 yd])

History
- Opened: 29 November 2008
Location

White City bus station serves the White City area of west London and Westfield London shopping centre.

The bus station was opened on 29 November 2008 to serve the new Westfield London shopping centre. The station has been built around the Grade II listed Dimco Buildings, originally the power station for the Central London Railway, which date from 1898.

The bus station is 100 metres away from Wood Lane tube station on the Circle and Hammersmith & City lines.

The following services serve the bus station: 31, 49, 148, 207, 228, 237, 260, 316, C1 and SL8.
