= List of busiest London Underground stations (2019) =

This is a list of busiest London Underground stations for the 2019 calendar year. The dataset for the year was the last to show typical patterns of mobility prior to the COVID-19 pandemic in the United Kingdom, with many major central London stations dropping in the ranking the following year.

The London Underground is a rapid transit system in the United Kingdom that serves London and the neighbouring counties of Essex, Hertfordshire and Buckinghamshire. Its first section opened in 1863. Annualised entry/exit counts were recorded at 268 stations in 2019. (Note: Bank and Monument stations operate as a combined station with shared usage statistics.) In 2019, King's Cross St Pancras was the busiest station on the network, used by over 88.27 million passengers, while Kensington (Olympia) was the least used, with 109,430 passengers. Data for 2019 was published on 1 April 2020 and was revised on 29 May 2020.

This table shows the busiest stations with over 33 million entries and exits in 2019.

Busiest London Underground stations (entries and exits, in millions)
Rank (2019)	Station	Zone(s)	2019	2018 (Note: The method of calculating usage changed in 2018 from estimates based on survey counts carried out on a few days to actual counts of gate entry date for each day.)	2017	2016	2015	2014	2013	2012	2011	2010
1	King's Cross St. Pancras	1	▼88.27	▼89.82	▲97.92	▲95.03	▲93.41	▲91.98	▲84.87	▲80.97	▲77.11	▲72.58
2	Victoria	1	▲85.47	▲84.47	▼79.36	▲83.50	▼82.89	▲86.73	▲84.58	▲82.96	▲82.25	▲79.93
3	Waterloo	1	▲82.93	▼76.54	▼91.27	▲100.36	▲95.14	▲91.49	▲89.40	▲88.16	▲84.12	▲81.57
4	Oxford Circus	1	▲78.07	▼76.40	▲84.09	▼83.26	▼92.36	▲98.51	▲85.25	▲80.55	▲77.09	▲70.12
5	London Bridge	1	▲74.34	▲70.20	▼69.05	▼70.74	▼71.96	▲74.98	▲69.88	▲67.16	▲65.44	▼60.79
6	Liverpool Street	1	▲67.20	▼65.03	▼67.74	▼71.61	▼73.26	▲73.66	▲67.89	▲64.23	▲63.65	▲62.72
7	Stratford	2/3	▲64.85	▲64.73	▼61.99	▲67.05	▲61.44	▲59.31	▲54.50	▲50.96	▲48.57	▲29.82
8	Bank and Monument (Note: Bank and Monument stations operate as a combined station with shared usage statistics.)	1	▲61.79	▼54.77	▼61.80	▲64.26	▲57.51	▲52.31	▲48.88	▼47.75	▲47.80	▲43.50
9	Paddington (Note: The two Paddington stations operate as a combined station with shared usage statistics.)	1	▲48.61	▼44.60	▼48.82	▼49.48	▲49.64	▼49.28	▲49.71	▼46.33	▲46.48	▲44.00
10	Canary Wharf	2	▲47.69	▼43.62	▼50.91	▲54.79	▲54.44	▲51.81	▲50.05	▲48.04	▲46.59	▲41.53
11	Tottenham Court Road (Note: The ranking of Tottenham Court Road was affected in 2011, as the Northern Line was not stopping there between 3 April and 28 November, and in 2015, as the Central line was not stopping there between 5 January and 7 December.)	1	▲41.99	▼38.73	▲41.33	▲39.35	▼16.25	▼36.76	▲38.06	▲36.01	▼23.99	▼34.55
12	Euston	1	▲41.09	▼31.51	▼43.07	▲43.10	▲42.16	▲41.33	▲38.03	▲37.53	▲35.32	▲33.57
13	Green Park	1	▲39.06	▼37.81	▼39.34	▲41.24	▼39.55	▲39.83	▲35.46	▲33.99	▲31.72	▲29.37
14	Piccadilly Circus	1	▼38.40	▼39.61	▼40.82	▼41.29	▼42.80	▲42.93	▼41.70	▲42.36	▲40.58	▲39.68
15	Bond Street	1	▼37.49	▼36.75	▼38.80	▲39.53	▲37.12	▼19.80	▲39.65	▲38.07	▼36.02	▲36.87
16	Leicester Square	1	▼34.56	▼35.07	▼36.73	▼37.84	▲43.75	▲43.31	▲38.60	▼38.51	▲38.78	▲36.94
18	South Kensington	1	▼33.07	▼32.25	▲33.86	▼33.60	▼33.87	▲36.46	▲32.75	▲32.50	▲30.61	▲29.78

== See also ==
- List of busiest London Underground stations (2025), (2024), (2023), (2022), (2021), & (2020)
- List of London Underground stations
- List of busiest railway stations in Great Britain (2019–20)
