= List of busiest London Underground stations (2021) =

This is a list of busiest London Underground stations for the 2021 calendar year. The dataset records patterns of mobility during the second year of the COVID-19 pandemic in the United Kingdom, with significantly reduced levels of mobility when compared with the 2019 data. Extended periods of significantly reduced commuting and other travel caused many major central London stations to drop in the ranking during 2020 and for larger suburban stations to replace them. With pandemic restrictions eliminated during the year, this was reversed during 2021.

The London Underground is a rapid transit system in the United Kingdom that serves London and the neighbouring counties of Essex, Hertfordshire and Buckinghamshire. Its first section opened in 1863. Annualised entry/exit counts were recorded at 270 stations in 2021. (Note: Bank and Monument stations operate as a combined station with shared usage statistics. Battersea Power Station and Nine Elms were added to the network during 2021.) In 2021, King's Cross St Pancras was the busiest station on the network, used by over 36.73 million passengers, while Kensington (Olympia) was the least used, with 34,499 passengers. Data for 2021 was published on 17 May 2022 and was revised on 8 July 2022.

This table shows the busiest stations with over 14 million entries and exits in 2021.

Busiest London Underground stations (entries and exits, in millions)
Rank (2021)	Station	Zone(s)	2021	2020	2019	2018 (Note: The method of calculating usage changed in 2018 from estimates based on survey counts carried out on a few days to actual counts of gate entry date for each day.)	2017	2016	2015	2014	2013	2012
1	King's Cross St Pancras	1	▲36.73	▼18.84	▼88.27	▼89.82	▲97.92	▲95.03	▲93.41	▲91.98	▲84.87	▲80.97
2	Victoria	1	▲33.48	▼22.95	▲85.47	▲84.47	▼79.36	▲83.50	▼82.89	▲86.73	▲84.58	▲82.96
3	Oxford Circus	1	▲32.86	▼14.60	▲78.07	▼76.40	▲84.09	▼83.26	▼92.36	▲98.51	▲85.25	▲80.55
4	London Bridge	1	▲30.86	▼24.72	▲74.34	▲70.20	▼69.05	▼70.74	▼71.96	▲74.98	▲69.88	▲67.16
5	Waterloo	1	▲29.87	▼16.62	▲82.93	▼76.54	▼91.27	▲100.36	▲95.14	▲91.49	▲89.40	▲88.16
6	Stratford	2/3	▲29.10	▼25.07	▲64.85	▲64.73	▼61.99	▲67.05	▲61.44	▲59.31	▲54.50	▲50.96
7	Liverpool Street	1	▲26.60	▼16.27	▲67.20	▼65.03	▼67.74	▼71.61	▼73.26	▲73.66	▲67.89	▲64.23
8	Paddington (Note: The two Paddington stations operate as a combined station with shared usage statistics.)	1	▲20.44	▼11.42	▲48.61	▼44.60	▼48.82	▼49.48	▲49.64	▼49.28	▲49.71	▼46.33
9	Canary Wharf	2	▲18.29	▼13.36	▲47.69	▼43.62	▼50.91	▲54.79	▲54.44	▲51.81	▲50.05	▲48.04
10	Bank and Monument (Note: Bank and Monument stations operate as a combined station with shared usage statistics.)	1	▲17.66	▼8.59	▲61.79	▼54.77	▼61.80	▲64.26	▲57.51	▲52.31	▲48.88	▼47.75
11	Leicester Square	1	▲16.34	▼3.95	▲34.56	▼35.07	▼36.73	▼37.84	▲43.75	▲43.31	▲38.60	▼38.51
12	Tottenham Court Road (Note: The ranking of Tottenham Court Road was affected in 2015, as the Central line was not stopping there between 5 January and 7 December.)	1	▲16.04	▼6.04	▲41.99	▼38.73	▲41.33	▲39.35	▼16.25	▼36.76	▲38.06	▲36.01
13	Green Park	1	▲15.94	▼9.44	▲39.06	▼37.81	▼39.34	▲41.24	▼39.55	▲39.83	▲35.46	▲33.99
14	Euston	1	▲15.88	▼8.79	▲41.09	▼31.51	▼43.07	▲43.10	▲42.16	▲41.33	▲38.03	▲37.53
15	Bond Street	1	▲15.69	▼9.68	▼37.49	▼36.75	▼38.80	▲39.53	▲37.12	▼19.80	▲39.65	▲38.07
16	Piccadilly Circus	1	▲14.14	▼4.17	▼38.40	▼39.61	▼40.82	▼41.29	▼42.80	▲42.93	▼41.70	▲42.36
17	Finsbury Park	2	▼14.05	▼15.82	▲33.44	▼23.89	▼31.22	▲32.74	▲28.85	▲28.00	▲27.07	▲26.04

== See also ==
- List of busiest London Underground stations (2025), (2024), (2023), (2022), (2020), & (2019)
- List of London Underground stations
- List of busiest railway stations in Great Britain
