= List of busiest London Underground stations (2023) =

This is a list of busiest London Underground stations for the 2023 calendar year. The dataset records increased levels of mobility when compared with the 2022 data although still not fully recovered from the peak of 2019.

The London Underground is a rapid transit system in the United Kingdom that serves London and the neighbouring counties of Essex, Hertfordshire and Buckinghamshire. Its first section opened in 1863. Annualised entry/exit counts were recorded at 270 stations in 2023. (Note: The number of stations varies each year as the network changes.) (Note: Bank and Monument stations operate as a combined station with shared usage statistics as do the two physically separate stations at Paddington.) In 2023, King's Cross St Pancras was the busiest station on the network, used by over 72.14 million passengers, while Roding Valley was the least used with 267,679 passengers. (Note: Kensington (Olympia) passengers are not recorded separately from London Overground passengers. Kentish Town station was closed throughout 2023.) Data for 2023 was published on 8 August 2024.

This table shows the busiest stations with over 33 million entries and exits in 2023.

Busiest London Underground stations (entries and exits, in millions)
Rank (2023)	Station	Zone(s)	2023	2022	2021	2020	2019	2018 (Note: The method of calculating usage changed in 2018 from estimates based on survey counts carried out on a few days to actual counts of gate entry date for each day.)	2017	2016	2015	2014
1	King's Cross St Pancras	1	▲72.12	▲69.94	▲36.73	▼18.84	▼88.27	▼89.82	▲97.92	▲95.03	▲93.41	▲91.98
2	Waterloo	1	▲70.33	▲68.72	▲29.87	▼16.62	▲82.93	▼76.54	▼91.27	▲100.36	▲95.14	▲91.49
3	Victoria	1	▲59.57	▲56.43	▲33.48	▼22.95	▲85.47	▲84.47	▼79.36	▲83.50	▼82.89	▲86.73
4	Tottenham Court Road (Note: The ranking of Tottenham Court Road was affected in 2015, as the Central line was not stopping there between 5 January and 7 December.)	1	▲58.72	▲48.95	▲16.04	▼6.04	▲41.99	▼38.73	▲41.33	▲39.35	▼16.25	▼36.76
5	Liverpool Street	1	▲57.23	▲55.83	▲26.60	▼16.27	▲67.20	▼65.03	▼67.74	▼71.61	▼73.26	▲73.66
6	London Bridge	1	▼54.77	▲56.20	▲30.86	▼24.72	▲74.34	▲70.20	▼69.05	▼70.74	▼71.96	▲74.98
7	Stratford (Note: Includes DLR usage.)	2/3	▲54.38	▲47.88	▲29.10	▼25.07	▲64.85	▲64.73	▼61.99	▲67.05	▲61.44	▲59.31
8	Oxford Circus	1	▼51.11	▲54.02	▲32.86	▼14.60	▲78.07	▼76.40	▲84.09	▼83.26	▼92.36	▲98.51
9	Paddington (Note: The two Paddington stations operate as a combined station with shared usage statistics.)	1	▲48.55	▲46.65	▲20.44	▼11.42	▲48.61	▼44.60	▼48.82	▼49.48	▲49.64	▼49.28
10	Farringdon	1	▲40.07	▲30.07	▲8.50	▼5.90	▲25.92	▲23.64	▲18.71	▼15.87	▲23.77	▲23.63
11	Bond Street	1	▲37.42	▲35.41	▲15.69	▼9.68	▼37.49	▼36.75	▼38.80	▲39.53	▲37.12	▼19.80
12	Bank and Monument (Note: Bank and Monument stations operate as a combined station with shared usage statistics. Includes DLR usage.)	1	▲37.20	▲34.40	▲17.66	▼8.59	▲61.79	▼54.77	▼61.80	▲64.26	▲57.51	▲52.31

== See also ==
- List of busiest London Underground stations (2025), (2024), (2022), (2021), (2020), & (2019)
- List of London Underground stations
- List of busiest railway stations in Great Britain
