= List of busiest London Underground stations (2022) =

This is a list of busiest London Underground stations for the 2022 calendar year. The dataset records patterns of mobility for the first full year after travel restrictions during the COVID-19 pandemic in the United Kingdom were completely eliminated, with increased levels of mobility when compared with the 2021 data although still not fully recovered from 2019.

The London Underground is a rapid transit system in the United Kingdom that serves London and the neighbouring counties of Essex, Hertfordshire and Buckinghamshire. Its first section opened in 1863. Annualised entry/exit counts were recorded at 270 stations in 2022. (Note: Bank and Monument stations operate as a combined station with shared usage statistics as do the two physically separate stations at Paddington.) In 2022, King's Cross St Pancras was the busiest station on the network, used by over 69.94 million passengers, while Roding Valley was the least used with 259,271 passengers. (Note: Kensington (Olympia) passengers are not recorded separately from London Overground passengers.) Data for 2022 was published on 4 October 2023.

This table shows the busiest stations with over 33 million entries and exits in 2022.

Busiest London Underground stations (entries and exits, in millions)
Rank (2022)	Station	Zone(s)	2022	2021	2020	2019	2018 (Note: The method of calculating usage changed in 2018 from estimates based on survey counts carried out on a few days to actual counts of gate entry date for each day.)	2017	2016	2015	2014	2013
1	King's Cross St Pancras	1	▲69.94	▲36.73	▼18.84	▼88.27	▼89.82	▲97.92	▲95.03	▲93.41	▲91.98	▲84.87
2	Waterloo	1	▲68.72	▲29.87	▼16.62	▲82.93	▼76.54	▼91.27	▲100.36	▲95.14	▲91.49	▲89.40
3	Victoria	1	▲56.43	▲33.48	▼22.95	▲85.47	▲84.47	▼79.36	▲83.50	▼82.89	▲86.73	▲84.58
4	London Bridge	1	▲56.20	▲30.86	▼24.72	▲74.34	▲70.20	▼69.05	▼70.74	▼71.96	▲74.98	▲69.88
5	Liverpool Street	1	▲55.83	▲26.60	▼16.27	▲67.20	▼65.03	▼67.74	▼71.61	▼73.26	▲73.66	▲67.89
6	Oxford Circus	1	▲54.02	▲32.86	▼14.60	▲78.07	▼76.40	▲84.09	▼83.26	▼92.36	▲98.51	▲85.25
7	Tottenham Court Road (Note: The ranking of Tottenham Court Road was affected in 2015, as the Central line was not stopping there between 5 January and 7 December.)	1	▲48.95	▲16.04	▼6.04	▲41.99	▼38.73	▲41.33	▲39.35	▼16.25	▼36.76	▲38.06
8	Stratford (Note: Includes DLR usage.)	2/3	▲47.88	▲29.10	▼25.07	▲64.85	▲64.73	▼61.99	▲67.05	▲61.44	▲59.31	▲54.50
9	Paddington (Note: The two Paddington stations operate as a combined station with shared usage statistics.)	1	▲46.65	▲20.44	▼11.42	▲48.61	▼44.60	▼48.82	▼49.48	▲49.64	▼49.28	▲49.71
10	Bond Street	1	▲35.41	▲15.69	▼9.68	▼37.49	▼36.75	▼38.80	▲39.53	▲37.12	▼19.80	▲39.65
11	Bank and Monument (Note: Bank and Monument stations operate as a combined station with shared usage statistics. Includes DLR usage.)	1	▲34.40	▲17.66	▼8.59	▲61.79	▼54.77	▼61.80	▲64.26	▲57.51	▲52.31	▲48.88

== See also ==
- List of busiest London Underground stations (2025), (2024), (2023), (2021), (2020), & (2019)
- List of London Underground stations
- List of busiest railway stations in Great Britain
