= List of busiest London Underground stations (2020) =

This is a list of busiest London Underground stations for the 2020 calendar year. The dataset records patterns of mobility during the first year of the COVID-19 pandemic in the United Kingdom, with significantly reduced levels of mobility when compared with the 2019 data. Extended periods of significantly reduced commuting and other travel caused many major central London stations to drop in the ranking during 2020 and for larger suburban stations to replace them.

The London Underground is a rapid transit system in the United Kingdom that serves London and the neighbouring counties of Essex, Hertfordshire and Buckinghamshire. Its first section opened in 1863. Annualised entry/exit counts were recorded at 268 stations in 2020. (Note: Bank and Monument stations operate as a combined station with shared usage statistics.) In 2020, Stratford was the busiest station on the network, used by over 25.07 million passengers, while Kensington (Olympia) was the least used, with 40,000 passengers. Data for 2020 was published on 1 April 2021.

This table shows the busiest stations with over 10 million entries and exits in 2020.

Busiest London Underground stations (entries and exits, in millions)
Rank (2020)	Station	Zone(s)	2020	2019	2018 (Note: The method of calculating usage changed in 2018 from estimates based on survey counts carried out on a few days to actual counts of gate entry date for each day.)	2017	2016	2015	2014	2013	2012	2011
1	Stratford	2/3	▼25.07	▲64.85	▲64.73	▼61.99	▲67.05	▲61.44	▲59.31	▲54.50	▲50.96	▲48.57
2	London Bridge	1	▼24.72	▲74.34	▲70.20	▼69.05	▼70.74	▼71.96	▲74.98	▲69.88	▲67.16	▲65.44
3	Victoria	1	▼22.95	▲85.47	▲84.47	▼79.36	▲83.50	▼82.89	▲86.73	▲84.58	▲82.96	▲82.25
4	King's Cross St Pancras	1	▼18.84	▼88.27	▼89.82	▲97.92	▲95.03	▲93.41	▲91.98	▲84.87	▲80.97	▲77.11
5	Waterloo	1	▼16.62	▲82.93	▼76.54	▼91.27	▲100.36	▲95.14	▲91.49	▲89.40	▲88.16	▲84.12
6	Liverpool Street	1	▼16.27	▲67.20	▼65.03	▼67.74	▼71.61	▼73.26	▲73.66	▲67.89	▲64.23	▲63.65
7	Finsbury Park	2	▼15.82	▲33.44	▼23.89	▼31.22	▲32.74	▲28.85	▲28.00	▲27.07	▲26.04	▲24.29
8	Vauxhall	1/2	▼15.46	▲32.30	▼30.08	▼30.83	▲32.23	▼26.83	▲27.51	▲25.15	▲22.84	▲20.87
9	Oxford Circus	1	▼14.60	▲78.07	▼76.40	▲84.09	▼83.26	▼92.36	▲98.51	▲85.25	▲80.55	▲77.09
10	Barking	4	▼14.29	▲18.13	▼17.87	▲18.20	▼15.86	▲16.06	▲15.59	▲15.22	▲14.51	▲13.96
11	Canary Wharf	2	▼13.36	▲47.69	▼43.62	▼50.91	▲54.79	▲54.44	▲51.81	▲50.05	▲48.04	▲46.59
12	Brixton	2	▼12.74	▲32.03	▼30.72	▼32.84	▲33.46	▲30.83	▲29.37	▲27.22	▲24.82	▲22.51
13	Paddington (Note: The two Paddington stations operate as a combined station with shared usage statistics.)	1	▼11.42	▲48.61	▼44.60	▼48.82	▼49.48	▲49.64	▼49.28	▲49.71	▼46.33	▲46.48
14	Canning Town	2/3	▼10.55	▲14.83	▲13.67	▲13.28	▲11.91	▲10.92	▲10.10	▲9.78	▲8.74	▲8.71
15	Walthamstow Central	3	▼10.44	▲18.92	▲17.12	▼9.59	▲22.77	▲18.33	▲18.05	▲16.68	▲15.09	▲14.32
16	Seven Sisters	3	▼10.31	▼17.02	▼17.92	▼18.33	▲18.61	▲17.52	▲15.97	▲14.46	▲13.25	▲12.53

== See also ==
- List of busiest London Underground stations (2025), (2024), (2023), (2022), (2021), & (2019)
- List of London Underground stations
- List of busiest railway stations in Great Britain (2020–21)
