= List of busiest London Underground stations =

This is a list of busiest London Underground stations for the 2025 calendar year.

The London Underground is a rapid transit system in the United Kingdom that serves London and the neighbouring counties of Essex, Hertfordshire and Buckinghamshire. Its first section opened in 1863. Annualised entry/exit counts were recorded at 270 stations in 2025. (Note: The number of stations varies each year as the network changes.) (Note: Bank and Monument stations operate as a combined station with shared usage statistics as do the two physically separate stations at Paddington.) In 2025, King's Cross St Pancras was the busiest station on the network, used by over 72.5 million passengers, while Roding Valley was the least used with 201,559 passengers. (Note: Kensington (Olympia) passengers are not recorded separately from London Overground passengers.) Data for 2025 was published on 13 April 2026.

This table shows the busiest stations with over 32 million entries and exits in 2025.

Busiest London Underground stations (entries and exits, in millions)
Rank (2025)	Station	Zone(s)	2025	2024	2023	2022	2021	2020	2019	2018 (Note: The method of calculating usage changed in 2018 from estimates based on survey counts carried out on a few days to actual counts of gate entry date for each day.)	2017	2016
1	King's Cross St Pancras	1	▼72.51	▲73.89	▲72.12	▲69.94	▲36.73	▼18.84	▼88.27	▼89.82	▲97.92	▲95.03
2	Waterloo	1	▼69.77	▼74.14	▲70.33	▲68.72	▲29.87	▼16.62	▲82.93	▼76.54	▼91.27	▲100.36
3	Tottenham Court Road (Note: The ranking of Tottenham Court Road was affected in 2015, as the Central line was not stopping there between 5 January and 7 December.)	1	▲59.94	▲59.45	▲58.72	▲48.95	▲16.04	▼6.04	▲41.99	▼38.73	▲41.33	▲39.35
4	Victoria	1	▼59.29	▲60.05	▲59.57	▲56.43	▲33.48	▼22.95	▲85.47	▲84.47	▼79.36	▲83.50
5	Liverpool Street	1	▲59.21	▲58.63	▲57.23	▲55.83	▲26.60	▼16.27	▲67.20	▼65.03	▼67.74	▼71.61
6	Paddington (Note: The two Paddington stations operate as a combined station with shared usage statistics.)	1	▲57.13	▲54.01	▲48.55	▲46.65	▲20.44	▼11.42	▲48.61	▼44.60	▼48.82	▼49.48
7	London Bridge	1	▼55.38	▲55.46	▼54.77	▲56.20	▲30.86	▼24.72	▲74.34	▲70.20	▼69.05	▼70.74
8	Stratford (Note: Includes DLR usage.)	2/3	▼52.43	▲53.38	▲54.38	▲47.88	▲29.10	▼25.07	▲64.85	▲64.73	▼61.99	▲67.05
9	Oxford Circus	1	▲51.58	▼50.94	▼51.11	▲54.02	▲32.86	▼14.60	▲78.07	▼76.40	▲84.09	▼83.26
10	Bond Street	1	▲41.69	▼39.39	▲37.42	▲35.41	▲15.69	▼9.68	▼37.49	▼36.75	▼38.80	▲39.53
11	Farringdon	1	▲41.43	▼39.53	▲40.07	▲30.07	▲8.50	▼5.90	▲25.92	▲23.64	▲18.71	▼15.87
12	Bank and Monument (Note: Bank and Monument stations operate as a combined station with shared usage statistics. Includes DLR usage.)	1	▲40.53	▲38.39	▲37.20	▲34.40	▲17.66	▼8.59	▲61.79	▼54.77	▼61.80	▲64.26
13	Euston	1	▲32.83	▲31.80	▲29.97	▲27.69	▲15.88	▼8.79	▲41.09	▼31.51	▼43.07	▲43.10
14	Canary Wharf	2	▲32.08	▲31.79	▲30.87	▲30.68	▲18.29	▼13.36	▲47.69	▼43.62	▼50.91	▲54.79

== See also ==
- List of busiest London Underground stations (2024), (2023), (2022), (2021), (2020), & (2019)
- List of London Underground stations
- List of busiest railway stations in Great Britain
