= Green Park tube station =

London Underground station

Green Park
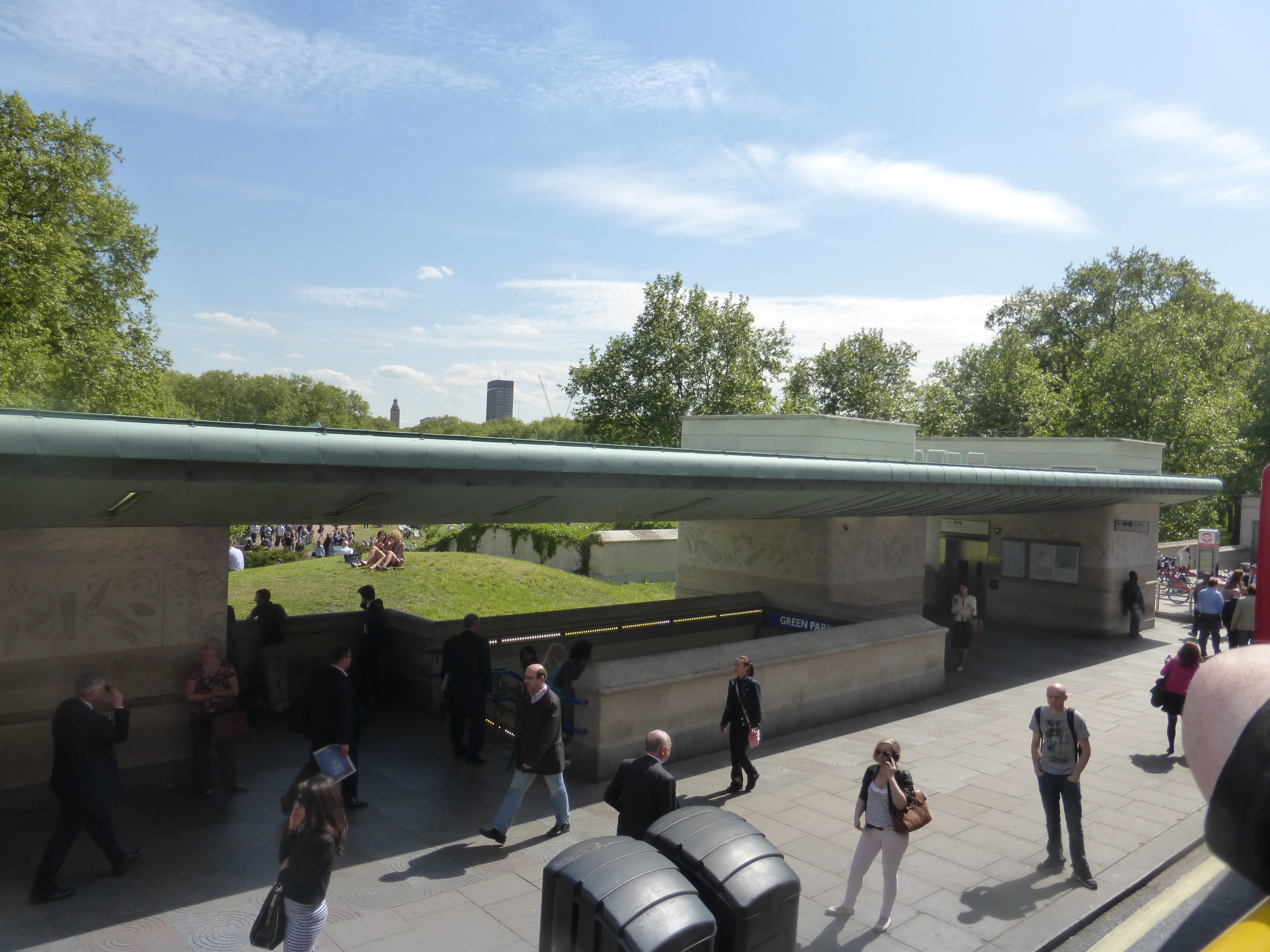
- The station entrance on the south side of Piccadilly
- Interactive map of Green Park

General information
- Location: Green Park
- Local authority: City of Westminster
- Managed by: London Underground
- Number of platforms: 6
- Accessible: Yes
- Fare zone: 1
- Cycle parking: No
- Toilet facilities: Yes

London Underground annual entry and exit
- 2021: ▲15.94 million
- 2022: ▲28.42 million
- 2023: ▼28.25 million
- 2024: ▲29.79 million
- 2025: ▼29.61 million

Key dates
- 15 December 1906: Opened (GNP&BR)
- 7 March 1969: Opened (Victoria line)
- 1 May 1979: Opened (Jubilee line)

Listed status
- Listed feature: Entrance within Devonshire House
- Listing grade: II
- Entry number: 1226746
- Added to list: 30 May 1972; 54 years ago

Other information
- External links: TfL station info page
- Coordinates: 51.5067°N 0.1428°W

Green Park is a London Underground station in Central London. It is located on the edge of Green Park, with entrances on both sides of Piccadilly. The station is served by three lines: Jubilee, Piccadilly and Victoria. On the Jubilee line the station is between Bond Street and Westminster stations, on the Piccadilly line it is between Hyde Park Corner and Piccadilly Circus stations, and on the Victoria line it is between Victoria and Oxford Circus stations. It is in London fare zone 1.

The station was opened in 1906 by the Great Northern, Piccadilly and Brompton Railway (GNP&BR) and was originally named Dover Street due to its location in that street. It was modernised in the 1930s when lifts were replaced with escalators and extended in the 1960s and 1970s when the Victoria and Jubilee lines were constructed.

== History ==
=== Piccadilly line ===
==== Rival schemes ====
During the final years of the 19th century and the early years of the 20th century numerous competing schemes for underground railways through central London were proposed. A number of the schemes submitted to parliament for approval as private bills included proposals for lines running under Piccadilly with stations in the area of the current Green Park station.

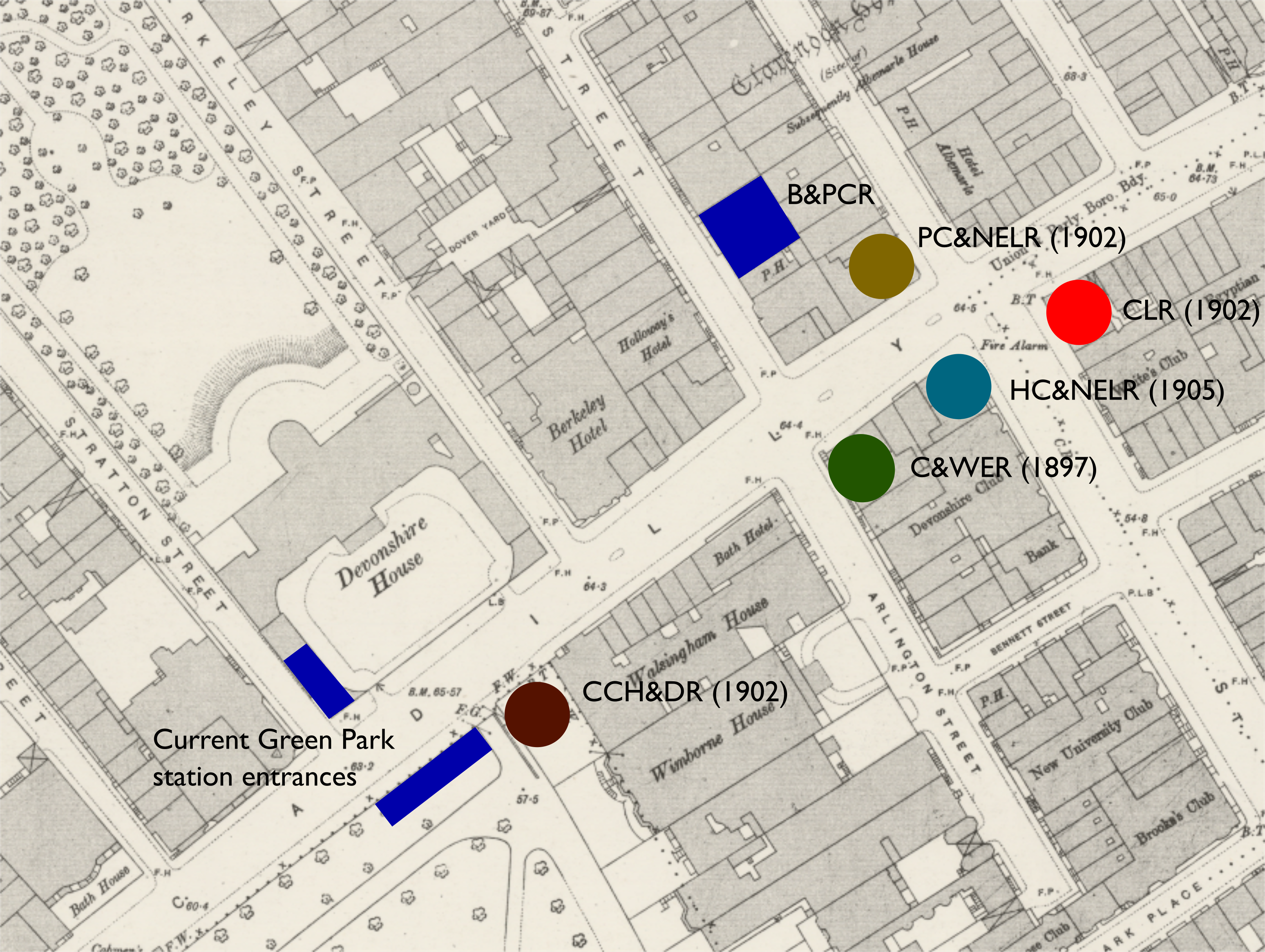
Location of original entrance to Dover Street station, approximate locations of stations proposed by rival companies and current Green Park station entrances

The first two proposals came before parliament in 1897. The Brompton and Piccadilly Circus Railway (B&PCR) proposed a line between South Kensington and Piccadilly Circus and the City and West End Railway (C&WER) proposed a line between Hammersmith and Cannon Street. The B&PCR proposed a station on the north side at Dover Street and the C&WER proposed a station on the south side at Arlington Street. Following review by parliament, the C&WER bill was rejected and the B&PCR bill was approved and received royal assent in August 1897.

In 1902, the Charing Cross, Hammersmith and District Railway (CCH&DR) proposed a line between Charing Cross and Barnes with a parallel shuttle line running between Hyde Park Corner and Charing Cross. A station was planned at Walsingham House on the north-east corner of Green Park. This scheme was rejected by parliament.

The same year, the Central London Railway (CLR, now the central section of the Central line) submitted a bill that aimed to turn its line running between Shepherd's Bush and Bank into a loop by constructing a second roughly parallel line to the south. This would have run along Piccadilly with a station at St James's Street just to the east of Dover Street. Delayed while a royal commission considered general principles of underground railways in London, the scheme was never fully considered and although it was re-presented in 1903, it was dropped two years later.

A third scheme for 1902 was the Piccadilly, City and North East London Railway (PC&NELR) which proposed a route between Hammersmith and Southgate. It planned a station at Albemarle Street, just to the east of Dover Street. Although favoured in parliament and likely to be approved, this scheme failed due to a falling-out between the backers and the sale of part of the proposals to a rival. (Note: The PC&NELR proposal was the result of a combination of several earlier schemes and it duplicated much of the B&PCR's route. Following a falling-out between the company's backers over the division of ownership, Speyer Brothers, the bank funding the B&PCR, were able to buy out the disgruntled backers of one of the schemes and the bank then withdrew its bill from consideration. This left the rest of the plans unable to proceed.)

In 1905, some of the promoters of the PC&NELR regrouped and submitted a proposal for the Hammersmith, City and North East London Railway. As the CLR had done previously, the company proposed a station at St James's Street. Owing to failures in the application process, this scheme was also rejected.

==== Construction and opening ====
While the various rival schemes were unsuccessful in obtaining parliamentary approval, the B&PCR was unsuccessful in raising the funds needed to construct its line. It was not until after the B&PCR had been taken over by Charles Yerkes's Metropolitan District Electric Traction Company that the money became available. Tunnelling began in 1902 shortly before the B&PCR was merged with the Great Northern and Strand Railway to create the Great Northern, Piccadilly and Brompton Railway (GNP&BR, the predecessor of the Piccadilly line). (Note: Yerkes business arrangements were complex and sometimes dubious. The B&PCR had been bought by the District Railway (DR) in 1898. The DR became a subsidiary of Yerkes' Metropolitan District Electric Traction Company (MDETC) in July 1901 and transferred the B&PCR to the MDETC in September 1901. In the same month, the B&PCR then took over the Great Northern and Strand Railway. In April 1902, the Underground Electric Railways Company of London was established by Yerkes. It, in turn, took over and replaced the MDETC in June 1902 and was the parent company of the GNP&BR from its formation in August 1902.)

The GNP&BR opened the station on 15 December 1906 as Dover Street. As with most of the other GNP&BR stations, the station building, on the east side of Dover Street, was designed by Leslie Green. It featured the company's standard red glazed terracotta facade with wide semi-circular arches at first-floor level. Platform and passageway walls were decorated in glazed cream tiles in Green's standard arrangement with margins, patterning and station names in mid-blue. (Note: The platform tiling was replaced around 1985, but rings of tiles reaching over the arch of the tunnels remained. A further re-tiling scheme around 2008 removed these so that nothing of Green's design remains.) When it opened, the station to the west was Down Street. (Note: Contemporary maps and later planning documents indicate that the station building occupied 5–7 Dover Street.) The station was provided with four Otis electric lifts paired in two 23-foot (7.0 m) diameter shafts and a spiral stair in a smaller shaft. The platforms are 27.4 metres (90 ft) below the level of Piccadilly.

==== Reconstruction ====
The station was busy and unsuccessful attempts to control crowds with gates at platform level were made in 1918. In the 1930s, the station was included amongst those modernised in conjunction with the northern and western extensions of the Piccadilly line. A new sub-surface ticket hall was opened on 18 September 1933 with a pair of Otis escalators provided to replace the lifts. The new ticket hall was accessed from subway entrances in Piccadilly. On the north side, an entrance was provided in Devonshire House on the corner with Stratton Street; on the south side an entrance was constructed on a piece of land taken from the park. The shelter for the southern entrance was designed by Charles Holden. (Note: The rebuilding of the station and similar works at Hyde Park Corner would bring the entrances of these stations closer together enabling the little-used station between them at Down Street to be closed on Saturday 21 May 1932 with the new escalators at Hyde Park coming into use on Monday 23 May.) The original station building, the lifts and the redundant below-ground passages were closed and the station was renamed Green Park. Part of the ground floor was used as a tea shop until the 1960s. In 1955, a third escalator was added to help deal with increased passenger numbers.

=== Victoria line ===
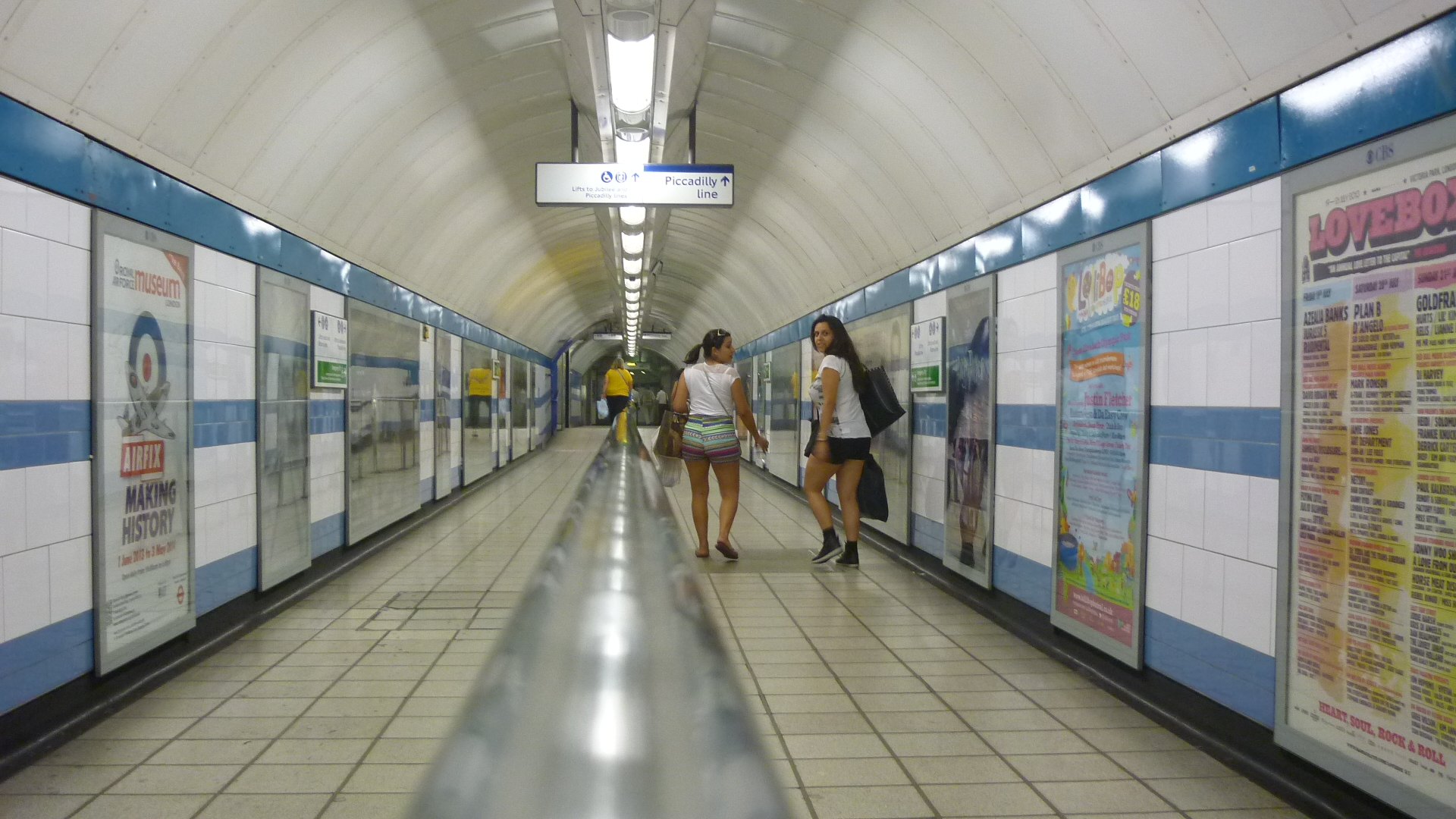
Interchange passage between the Piccadilly and Victoria lines

Proposals for an underground line linking Victoria to Finsbury Park date from 1937 when planning by the London Passenger Transport Board (LPTB) for future services considered a variety of new routes and extensions to existing lines. (Note: Developments of the initial proposal continued during and after World War II through the Railway (London Plan) Committee's Route 8 in 1946 and the LPTB's Scheme D in 1947, the latter being the first to plan an interchange at Green Park. Following nationalisation of public transport in 1948, the London Transport Executive produced a report in 1949 containing a Route C which made modifications to Scheme D at each end, but retained the central section between Victoria and King's Cross St. Pancras unaltered.) Parliament approved the line in 1955, but a shortage of funds meant that work did not start until after government loans were approved in 1962. (Note: Before funding to construct the whole line was approved, London Transport tested new tunnelling techniques by constructing 1 mile (1.6 km) of twin experimental tunnels along the planned route from Finsbury Park to South Tottenham between January 1960 and July 1961.)

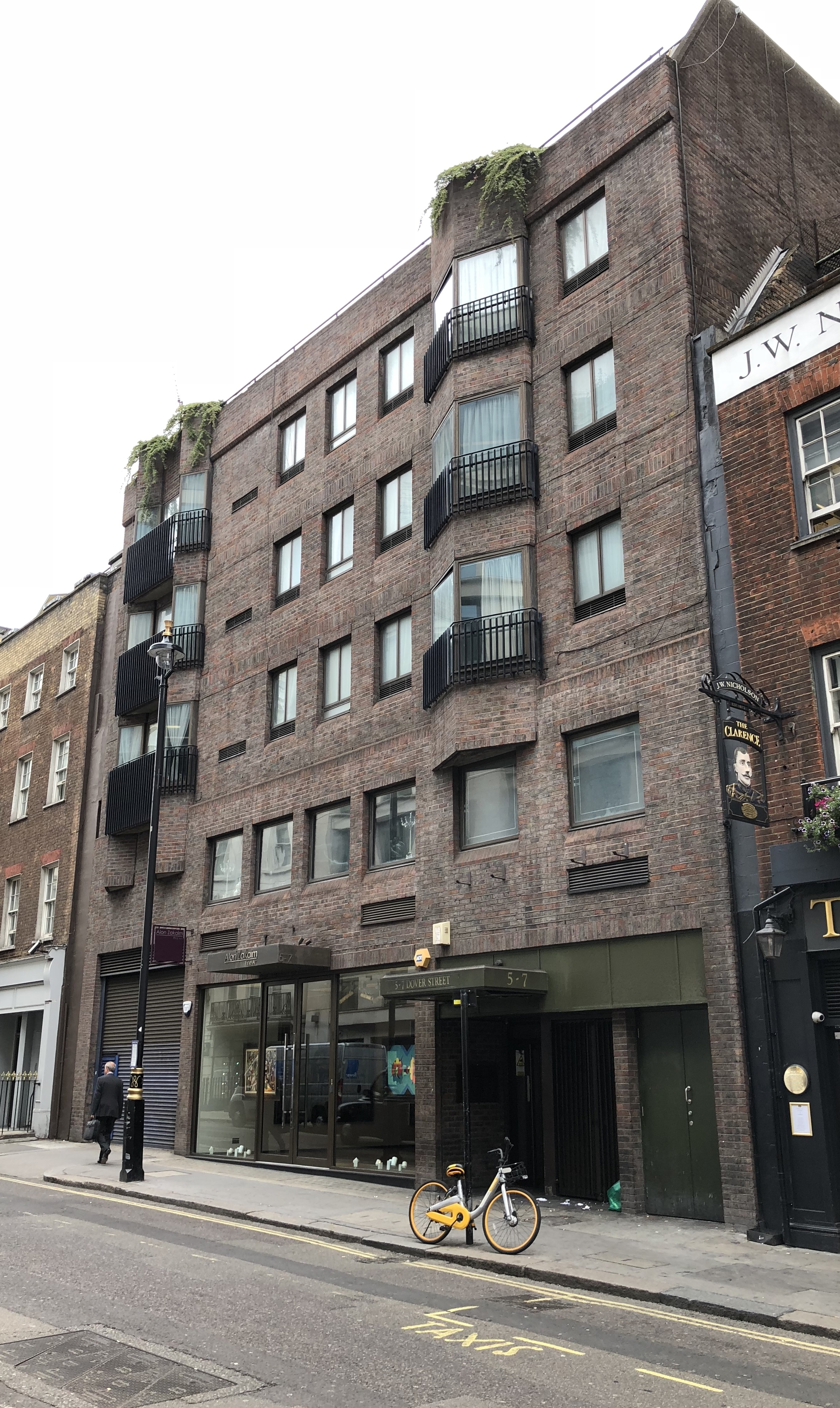
The current building at 5–7 Dover Street, site of the original station entrance

Construction works began in 1962. The 1930s ticket hall under the roadway of Piccadilly was enlarged to provide space for new Victoria line escalators and a long interchange passageway was provided between the Victoria line and Piccadilly line platforms. In 1965 a collapse of soft ground during the excavation of one of the tunnels near Green Park station meant that the ground had to be chemically stabilised before work could continue. The disused station building in Dover Street was demolished the following year in conjunction with the works for the new line. A vent shaft was constructed and an electrical sub-station was built in the basement of the new building. (Note: Planning permission was granted in 1965 for a new building and in 1968 for a ventilation shaft for the Victoria line and an electrical sub-station. Although painted-over, remnants of Green's tiling from the left and right sides of the building's facade remain attached to retained sections of the flank walls each side of the current building (see photograph of existing building).) The 1930s entrance on the south side of Piccadilly was also reconstructed.

The enlarged ticket hall, new platforms and passageways were decorated in grey tiles. Platforms are approximately 23.4 metres (77 ft) below street level. Platform roundel signs were on backlit illuminated panels. Seat recesses on the Victoria line platforms were tiled in an abstract pattern by Hans Unger of coloured circles representing a bird's-eye view of trees in Green Park.

After trial running of empty trains from 24 February 1969, the Victoria line platforms opened on 7 March 1969 with the opening of the third stage of the line between Warren Street and Victoria. The same day, Queen Elizabeth II officially opened the line by riding a train from Green Park to Oxford Circus. (Note: The Victoria line opened in stages: Walthamstow Central to Highbury & Islington (1 September 1968), Highbury & Islington to Warren Street (1 December 1968), Warren Street to Victoria (7 March 1969) and Victoria to Brixton (23 July 1971). Construction of the final stage was only approved in 1966 after the works on the rest of the line had started.)

=== Jubilee line ===
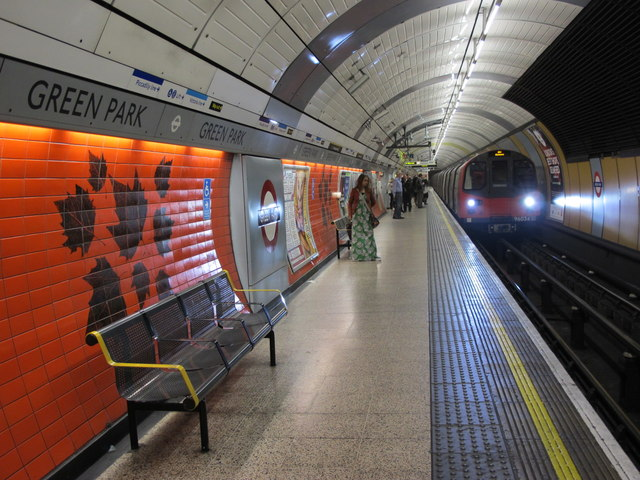
Jubilee line platform with leaf design by June Fraser

The origins of the Jubilee line are less clearly defined than those of the Victoria line. During World War II and throughout the 1950s and early 1960s consideration was given to various routes connecting north-west and south-east London via the West End and the City of London. Planning of the Victoria line had the greater priority and it was not until after construction of that line started that detailed planning began for the new line, first called the Fleet line in 1965 as it was planned to run in an east–west direction along Fleet Street. Lack of funding meant that only the first stage of the proposed line, from Baker Street to Charing Cross, received royal assent in July 1969; funding was agreed in August 1971. (Note: Funding for Stage 1 of the line was to come from the Greater London Council and central government in the ratio 1:3.)

Tunnelling began in February 1972 and was completed by the end of 1974. In 1977, during construction of the stations, the name of the line was changed to the Jubilee line, to mark the Queen's Silver Jubilee that year. (Note: The decision to change the name of the line was made by the Greater London Council, although the line was not expected to open until 1978. Subsequent delays in the installation of escalators and fitting-out of stations pushed the opening date into 1979.) A construction shaft in Hays Mews north of the station was used for an electrical substation and ventilation shaft. At Green Park, the ticket hall was enlarged slightly to provide space for escalators for the new line which connect to an intermediate concourse providing interchange between the Jubilee and Victoria lines. A second flight of escalators descends to the Jubilee line platforms, which are 31.1 metres (102 ft) below street level, the deepest of the three sets. Interchange between the Jubilee and Piccadilly lines was via the ticket hall. Platform walls were tiled in a deep red with black leaf patterns by June Fraser. Trial running of trains began in August 1978 and the Jubilee line opened on 1 May the next year. The line had been officially opened by Prince Charles the previous day, starting with a train journey from Green Park to Charing Cross. In 1993, to alleviate congestion, a third escalator was installed in the lower flight to replace a fixed staircase.

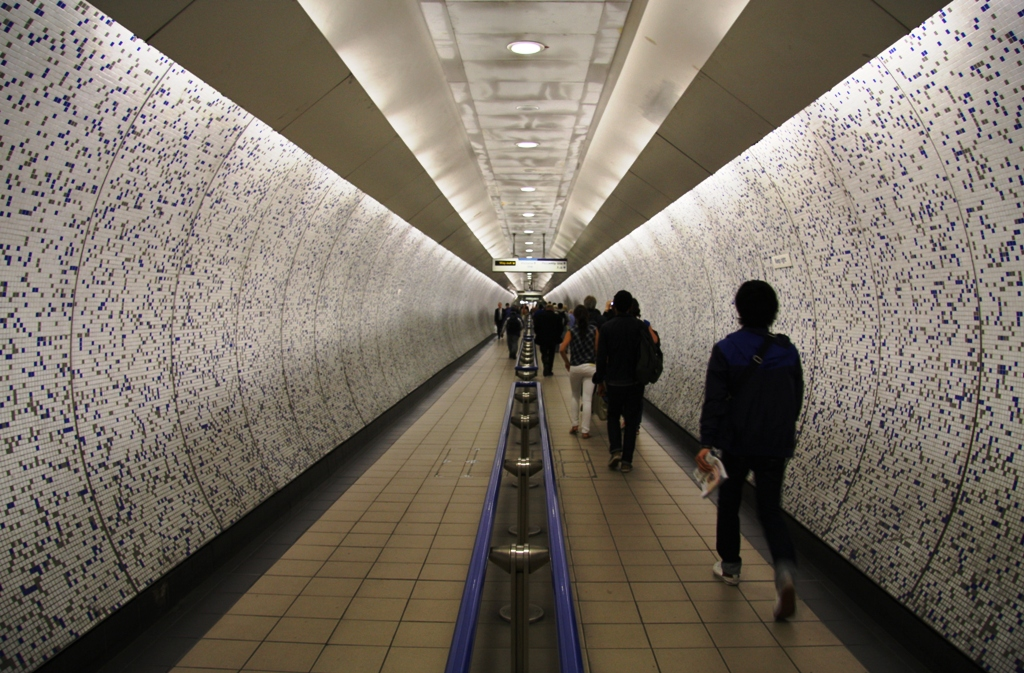
Interchange passage between the Jubilee and Piccadilly lines

Work on the Fleet line's stages 2 and 3 did not proceed and it was not until 1992 that an alternative route was approved. (Note: Although London Transport obtained permission for Stage 2 (Charing Cross to Fenchurch Street via Ludgate Circus and Cannon Street in 1971 and Stage 3 (Fenchurch Street to Lewisham via New Cross) in 1972, uncertainty as to the appropriate eastern destination of the line and shortage of funds meant that the works were never begun. A variety of alternative routes were considered during the 1970s and 1980s until a final route taking the line to Stratford was approved in 1992.) The Jubilee line extension took the line south and east of the River Thames via Waterloo and Canary Wharf, which was impractical to reach from the line's existing terminus at Charing Cross. New tunnels branching from the original route south of Green Park were constructed, and the line to Charing Cross was closed. Tunnelling began in May 1994, and improvements were carried out at Green Park to provide a direct passageway connection between the Jubilee and Piccadilly lines, including lifts to the platforms at each end. A new ventilation shaft and an emergency exit to Arlington Street were built. The new extension opened in stages starting at Stratford in the east, with services to Charing Cross ending on 19 November 1999 and the final section between Green Park and Waterloo opening the following day.

=== Recent changes ===
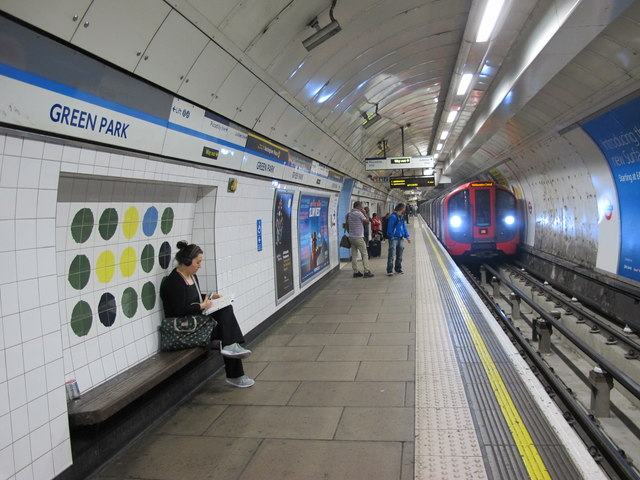
Refurbished Victoria line platform with reinstated Hans Unger tile design in seat recesses (close-up)

In 2008, Transport for London (TfL) announced a project to provide step-free access to all three lines in advance of the 2012 London Olympics. (Note: The project was a TfL-funded games-enabling project in its investment programme, though not a project specifically funded as a result of the success of the London 2012 Games bid. It was included in the strategy on accessible transport published by the London 2012 Olympic Delivery Authority and the London Organising Committee of the Olympic and Paralympic Games. The other stations where games-enabling step-free access projects were carried-out were Baker Street (sub-surface lines) and Southfields.) The project also included the construction of a new entrance on the south side of Piccadilly with ramped access directly from Green Park designed by Capita Symonds and Alacanthus LW architects. Work commenced in May 2009 to install two lifts from the ticket hall to the Victoria line platforms and the interchange passageway to the Piccadilly line. This work and a third lift in the new park-side entrance between the street level and the ticket hall were completed ahead of schedule in 2011. (Note: With the two low-level lifts installed when the new interchange passage was opened in 1999, interchange for wheelchair users between all platforms is possible.) At the same time, Green Park station underwent a major improvement programme which saw the tiling on the Victoria and Piccadilly line platforms and the interchange passageways replaced. (Note: The original platform tiling on many of the Victoria line stations was poorly fixed and a number of stations had patches of missing tiles, which led to wholesale replacement at some stations.) When the Jubilee line opened, the Hans Unger tiling in the seat recesses of the Victoria line platforms was replaced with a design using the leaf patterns used on the Jubilee line platforms; the Unger design was reinstated during the restoration.

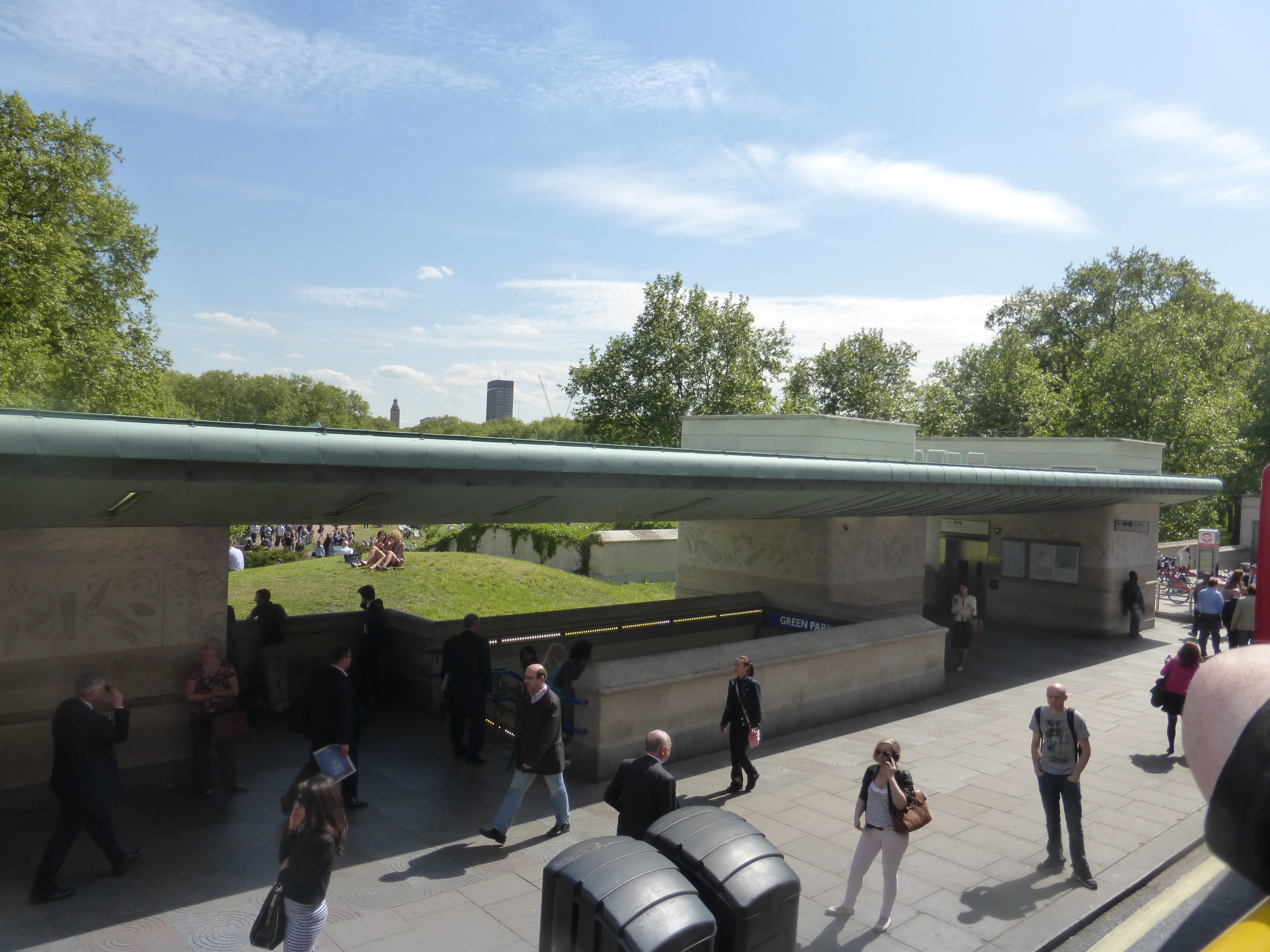
Entrance and shelter on Piccadilly

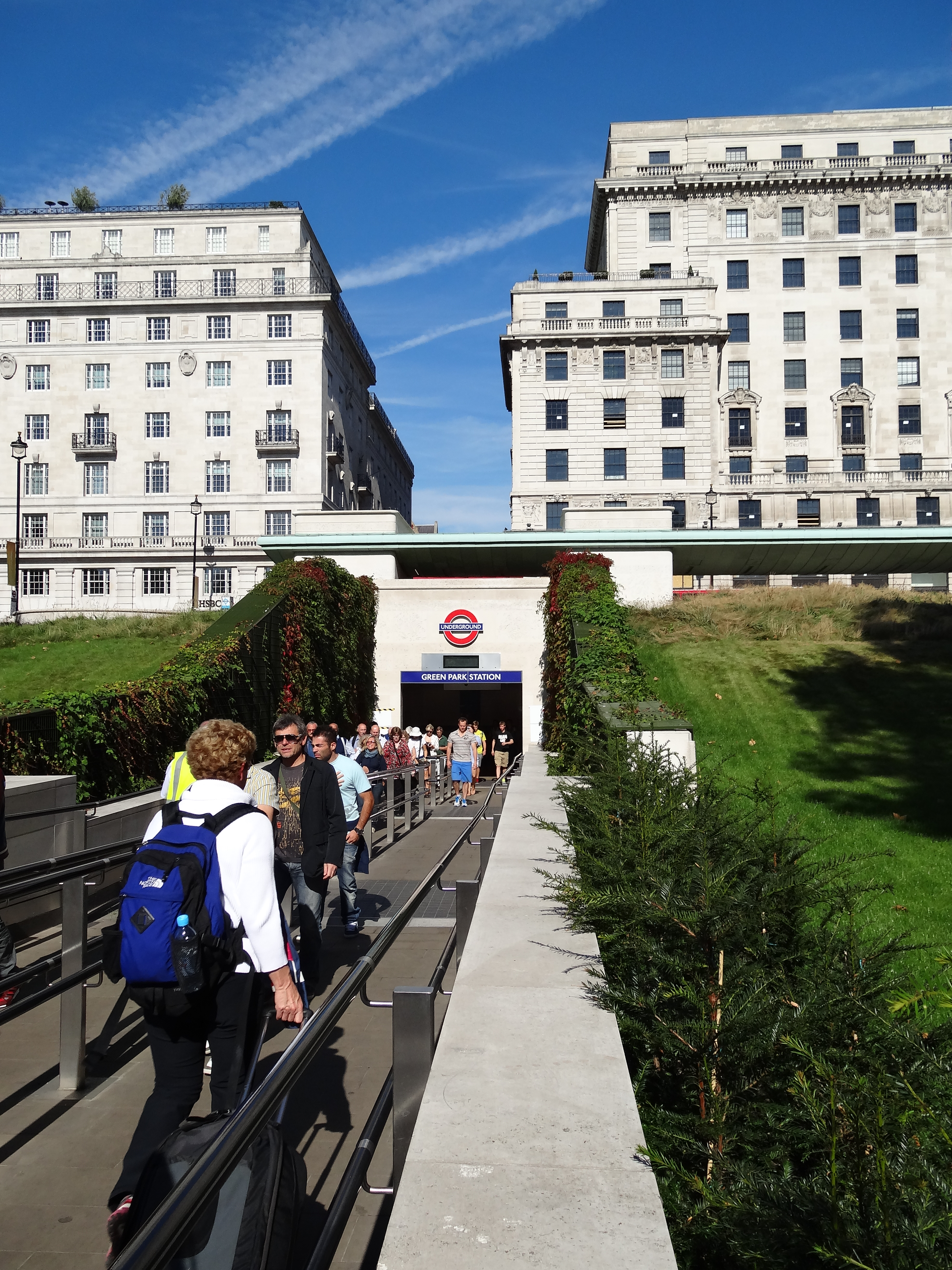
Entrance from Green Park

Southern entrance

The new park entrance and street level shelter feature artwork within the Portland stone cladding titled Sea Strata designed by John Maine RA. The Diana Fountain was relocated from its original site in the centre of the park to form the centrepiece of the new entrance.

To help moderate temperatures in the station, a system using cool ground water extracted from boreholes sunk 130 metres (430 ft) into the chalk aquifer below London was installed. The extracted water passes through a heat exchanger connected to the cast-iron tunnel lining and the warmed water is returned to the aquifer through a second set of boreholes 200 metres (660 ft) away.

== Proposal for new connection ==
In July 2005, a report, DLR Horizon 2020 Study, for the Docklands Light Railway (DLR) examined schemes to expand and improve the DLR network between 2012 and 2020. One of the proposals was an extension of the DLR from Bank to Charing Cross. Unused tunnels under Strand constructed as part of Stage 1 of the Fleet line would be enlarged to accommodate the larger DLR trains. In 2011, the DLR published a proposal to continue the extension to Victoria via Green Park. No further work has been done on these proposals.

== Piccadilly bombing ==
At around 9:00 pm on 9 October 1975, members of the Provisional IRA's Balcombe Street Gang detonated a bomb at a bus stop outside Green Park station, killing 23-year-old Graham Ronald Tuck and injuring 20 others. The attack was part of a bombing campaign carried out by the gang and in addition to the death and injuries caused damage to the Ritz Hotel and neighbouring buildings.

== Location ==
The station is near The Ritz Hotel, the Royal Academy of Arts, St James's Palace, Berkeley Square, Bond Street, the Burlington Arcade, Fortnum & Mason and Wynn Mayfair. It is one of two stations serving Buckingham Palace (the other being St James's Park).

It is served by London Buses routes 9, 14, 19, 22, 23 and 38, and night routes N9, N19, N22, N38 and N97.

== Services ==
Green Park station is on the Jubilee, Piccadilly and Victoria lines in London fare zone 1. On the Jubilee line the station is between Bond Street and Westminster, on the Piccadilly line it is between Hyde Park Corner and Piccadilly Circus, and on the Victoria line it is between Victoria and Oxford Circus. On weekdays Jubilee line trains typically run every 2–2 1/2 minutes between 05:38 and 00:34 northbound and 05:26 and 00:45 southbound; on the Piccadilly line trains typically run every 2½–3½ minutes between 05:48 and 00:34 westbound and 00:32 eastbound, and on the Victoria line trains typically run every 100–135 seconds between 05:36 and 00:39 northbound and 05:36 and 00:31 southbound.

With 29.79 million entries and exits in 2024, it was ranked the 15th busiest London Underground station.

Preceding station	London Underground	Following station
Bond Street towards Stanmore	Jubilee line	Westminster towards Stratford
Hyde Park Corner towards Uxbridge, Rayners Lane or Heathrow Airport (Terminal 4 or Terminal 5)	Piccadilly line	Piccadilly Circus towards Cockfosters or Arnos Grove
Victoria towards Brixton	Victoria line	Oxford Circus towards Walthamstow Central
Former services
Preceding station	London Underground	Following station
Bond Street towards Stanmore	Jubilee line 1979–99	Charing Cross Terminus
Down Street towards Hammersmith	Piccadilly line 1907–32	Piccadilly Circus towards Finsbury Park

== In popular culture ==
The opening scene of the 1997 film version of Henry James's The Wings of the Dove was set on the eastbound platforms at both Dover Street and Knightsbridge stations, both represented by the same studio mock-up, complete with a working recreation of a 1906 Stock train.
