= Hans Ernest Unger =

British poster artist, designer and mosaicist (1915–1975)

- Born: 8 August 1915; Prenzlau, Germany
- Died: 1975 (aged 59–60); London, England
- Occupations: Poster artist; designer; mosaicist

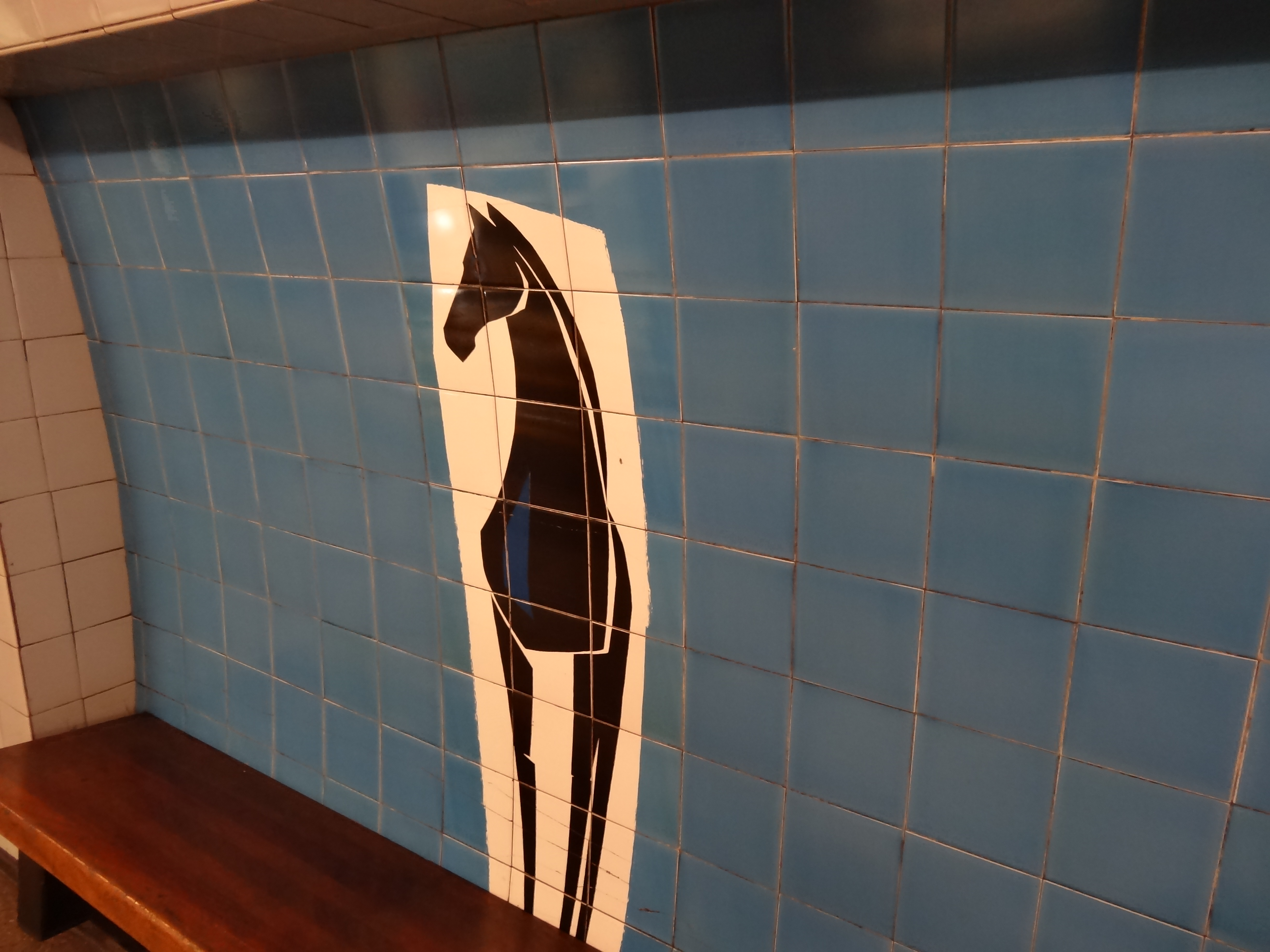
Tile design by Unger at Blackhorse Road station, London, c. 1968

Hans Ernest Unger (8 August 1915 – 1975) was a German-born British poster artist, designer and mosaicist.

== Early life ==
Unger was born in Prenzlau, Germany on 8 August 1915. His father was a lawyer, and Hans studied medicine in Berlin until 1933 when Adolf Hitler became Chancellor.

From 1934 to 1935, Unger studied poster design in Jupp Wiertz's studio in Berlin. As he was of Jewish heritage, Unger left Nazi Germany and moved to South Africa in 1936. He worked for the Cape Times, and won two poster competitions in South Africa, for the Post Office and the Port Elizabeth Travel Association.

== Second World War ==
During the Second World War, he joined the South African Army, and in 1942 was taken prisoner in Tobruk, Libya. He escaped from a prisoner of war camp in northern Italy, and crossed the Pyrenees to Spain and thence Portugal, but lost several toes from frostbite. In 1944, he was awarded the Military Medal.

== Career ==
In 1948, he moved to London and became a British citizen. As a designer, he worked extensively for London Transport, and the General Post Office and other companies.

== Personal life ==
Unger did not have any children himself, but was a close friend of fellow poster artist Abram Games, whose children called him "Uncle". He died in London in 1975.

== Legacy ==
His work is in the permanent collections of the V&A, and the London Transport Museum.
