= Victoria tube station =

London Underground station

Victoria
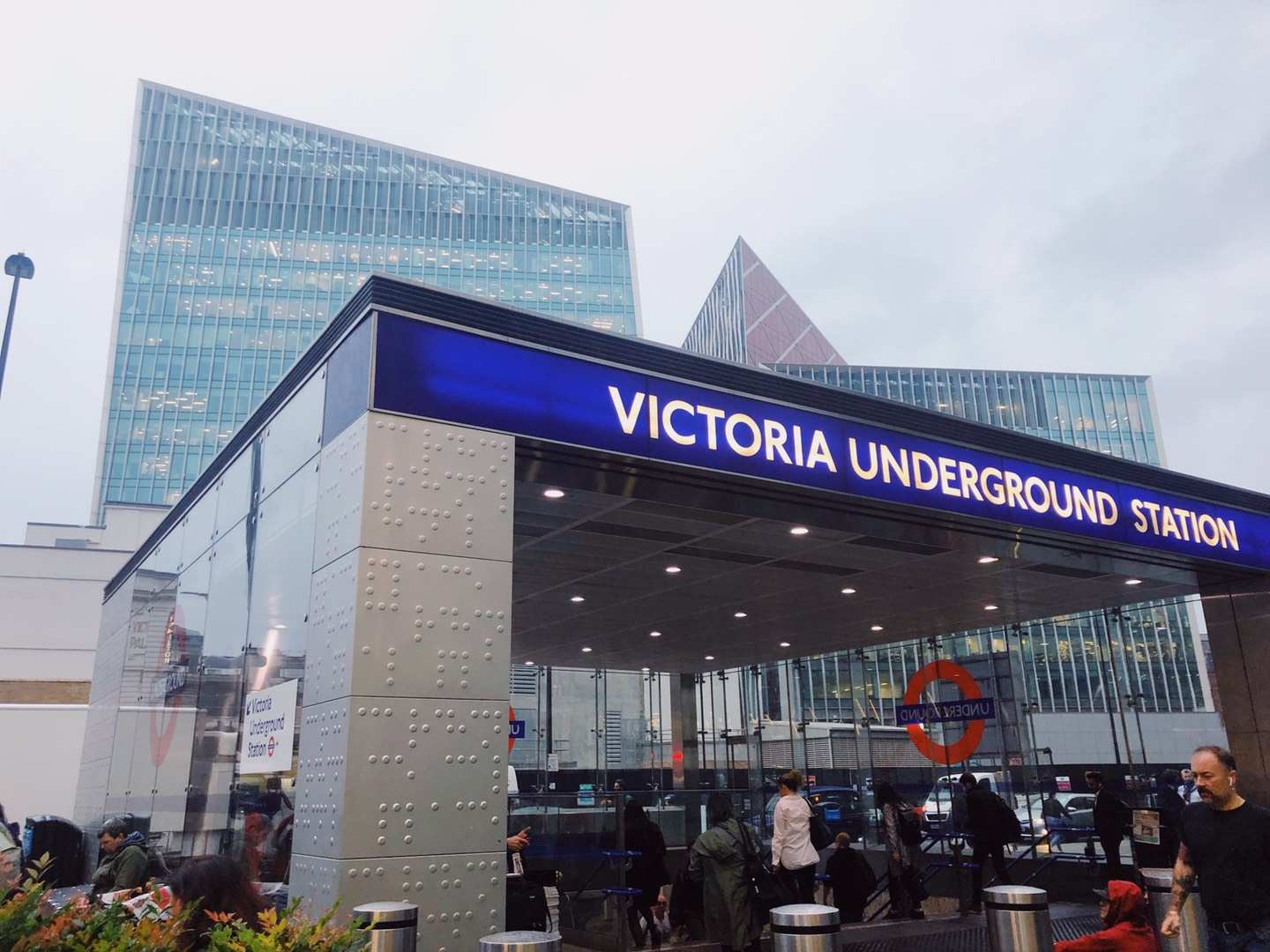
- Entrance at Cardinal Place
- Interactive map of Victoria

General information
- Location: Belgravia
- Local authority: City of Westminster
- Managed by: London Underground
- Owner: Transport for London
- Number of platforms: 4
- Accessible: Yes
- Fare zone: 1
- OSI: London Victoria

London Underground annual entry and exit
- 2021: ▲33.48 million
- 2022: ▲56.43 million
- 2023: ▲59.57 million
- 2024: ▲60.05 million
- 2025: ▲60.16 million

Key dates
- 1868: Opened (DR)
- 1872: Started "Outer Circle" (NLR)
- 1872: Started "Middle Circle" (H&CR/DR)
- 1900: Ended "Middle Circle"
- 1908: Ended "Outer Circle"
- 1949: Started (Circle line)
- 1969: Opened as terminus (Victoria line)
- 1971: Extended south (Victoria line)
- 2018: Rebuilt to provide complete step-free access

Other information
- Coordinates: 51.4956°N 0.1436°W

Victoria is a London Underground station in Victoria, London, sitting adjacent to the mainline station. It is served by three lines: Circle, District and Victoria. The station is in London fare zone 1. It is the 3rd busiest station on the Underground, and is made up of two separate component parts occupying different levels on the tube network, and built over a century apart from each other. The earlier section serves the Circle and District lines, while the later one serves the Victoria line. There are two individual ticket halls, and a link between them.

The first tube station was constructed in 1868 by the District Railway, extended to serve the Outer Circle and Middle Circle services during the 19th century. The Victoria line portion of the station was proposed in the 1940s, opening in 1969. As a result of increased traffic, the station was extensively rebuilt in the early 21st century to satisfy passenger demands.

== History ==
Victoria railway station first opened in 1860, as part of efforts to provide a more convenient railway termini for railways south of London. It is located in Victoria in the City of Westminster, south of Victoria Street, east of Buckingham Palace Road and west of Vauxhall Bridge Road. The railway station is named after the nearby Victoria Street.

=== Circle and District lines ===
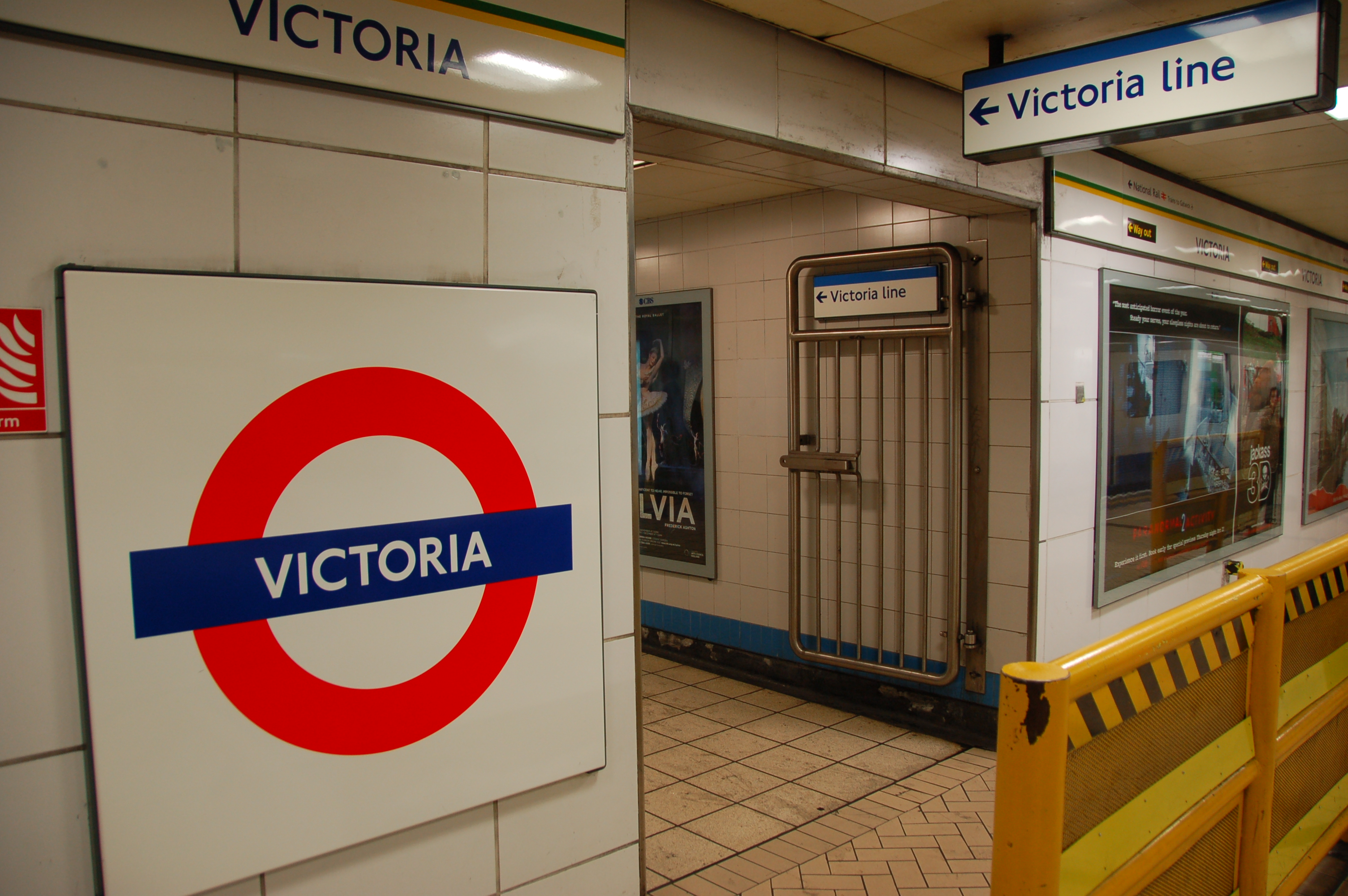
Circle and District line platforms

The first part of the Underground station was opened on 24 December 1868 by the District Railway (DR, now the District line) when the company opened the first section of its line, between South Kensington and Westminster. The DR connected to the Metropolitan Railway (MR, later the Metropolitan line) at South Kensington and, although the two companies were rivals, each company operated trains over the other's tracks in a joint service known as the "Inner Circle". The line was operated by steam locomotives, creating the necessity to leave periodic gaps open to the air.

On 1 February 1872, the DR opened a northward branch from Earl's Court to the West London Extension Joint Railway (WLEJR, now the West London Line) at Addison Road (now Kensington (Olympia)). From that date the "Outer Circle" service began running over the DR. The service was run by the North London Railway (NLR) from Broad Street (now demolished) in the City of London via the North London Line to Willesden Junction, then the West London Line to Addison Road and the DR to Mansion House, the new eastern terminus of the DR.

From 1 August 1872, the "Middle Circle" service also began operation through Victoria, from Moorgate along the MR on the north side of the Inner Circle to Paddington, then over the Hammersmith & City Railway (H&CR) to Latimer Road and then to Mansion House. On 30 June 1900, the Middle Circle service was withdrawn between Earl's Court and Mansion House, with the Outer Circle service following on 31 December 1908.

The original DR station was rebuilt at the beginning of the 20th century, initially as a single-storey structure to the design of architect George Campbell Sherrin. An office building was built above it later. The line was electrified in 1905. In 1949, the Inner Circle route was given its own identity on the tube map as the Circle line.

=== Victoria line ===
Plans for the route that eventually became the Victoria line date from the 1940s. A proposal for a new underground railway line linking north-east London with the centre was included in the County of London Plan in 1943. Between 1946 and 1954, a series of routes were proposed by different transport authorities to connect various places in south and north or north-east London. Each of these connected the three main-line termini at King's Cross, Euston and Victoria. (Note: In 1946, the Railway (London Plan) Committee published a report including "Route 8 – South to North link from East Croydon to Finsbury Park", a main-line service running between Norbury and Hornsey in tunnel via Streatham Hill, Brixton, Vauxhall, Victoria, Bond Street, Euston, King's Cross and Finsbury Park. In 1947, the London Passenger Transport Board produced a plan for a similar route for a tube line running into north-east London. This would run between Coulsdon North or Sanderstead and Walthamstow (Hoe Street) or Waltham Cross. These plans were reviewed by the British Transport Commission in 1949 and a feasibility study was recommended. This became a combined route, "Route C" running between Walthamstow and Victoria.) A route was approved in 1955 with future extensions to be decided later, though funding for the construction was not approved by the government until 1962.

As part of the construction of the Victoria line, a new ticket hall was constructed just outside the main railway building. From the ticket hall, a set of escalators led down to the new Victoria line. The Victoria line station opened on 7 March 1969, when the third phase of the line began operating, south of Warren Street. Queen Elizabeth II officially opened the line on this date, unveiling a plaque in the station concourse. Victoria was the terminus while the final phase was under construction to Brixton. This opened on 23 July 1971.

There are two sidings to the south of the Victoria line platforms plus another crossover to the north to enable trains to terminate and turn back north.

=== Station upgrade and expansion ===
Following growth in passenger numbers in the 2000s, Victoria Underground station became one of the busiest on the Underground, with around 80 million passengers a year. At rush hour, more than 30,000 passengers entered the station between 8 and 9am, and entrances to the station were frequently closed due to dangerous levels of overcrowding at platform level.

TfL subsequently upgraded and expanded the station at a cost of £700m between 2011 and 2018 to alleviate overcrowding and to provide step-free access. The work included expansion of the existing south "Victoria line" ticket hall, an additional entrance and ticket hall under Bressenden Place, new and replaced escalators, renovation and expansion work throughout the existing station, and step-free access. Overall, the work expanded the station by 110%, with 9 new escalators and 7 new lifts.

Although contributors to the public inquiry into the upgrade criticised that access to platforms was long and/or indirect compared to the direct access using the existing escalators, the work was permitted in July 2009. Construction began in 2011, and tunnelling for the project was completed in 2015 after complex work; tunnelling took place 60 cm from the existing District and Circle line tunnels.

The first phase of the project opened in January 2017, with a new entrance leading to a North Ticket Hall underneath Bressenden Place, linked to the Victoria line by new escalators and lifts. The work was undertaken by a joint venture of BAM Nuttall and Taylor Woodrow Construction. In January 2018, the second phase of the project opened, with a new entrance at Wilton Road in front of the mainline station and the expanded Victoria line ticket hall. The main project was completed in October 2018, when step free access between all lines was completed, making Victoria the 75th tube station to have this. Work to reinstate the bus station and the historic Duke of York public house continued until 2019.

== Artwork ==
The station features several pieces of artwork. On the station concourse, there is a Labyrinth designed by Mark Wallinger, as part of the celebrations of 150 years of London Underground. As with all Victoria line stations, a tiled mural is located in the seat niches on the platforms – at Victoria, a silhouette of Queen Victoria was designed by Edward Bawden.

== Future ==
Victoria is a proposed stop on Crossrail 2, the route of which has been safeguarded since 1991. The project would involve the construction of two new 250-metre (820 ft) long platforms, and new entrances onto Ebury Street and the mainline station. The District and Circle line ticket hall would be expanded and include a direct connection to the new Crossrail station. Crossrail 2 trains would also be able to reverse at Victoria. The service proposes to run 30 additional trains per hour through the station, which is expected to reduce crowding in Victoria by 25%.

The Docklands Light Railway has also been proposed to be linked with Victoria. This would be a continuation of the line from Bank via City Thameslink, with another branch to Euston. As of 2020, these extensions of the DLR are not being progressed.

In January 2020, Victoria BID – the local Business improvement district – proposed removing the bus station from the mainline station forecourt to create a new "Station Square". Bus stops would be relocated to nearby streets.

== Usage ==
Victoria is currently the 3rd busiest station on the London Underground with 62.69 million passengers using the station in 2024. The station was not built for this number of passengers, which resulted in overcrowding requiring crowd control measures to be implemented at busy times. The 2018 upgrades have helped alleviate this.

== Services ==
=== District line ===
On the District line, Victoria station is between Sloane Square to the west and St James's Park to the east, and shares track with the Circle line. The typical off-peak service on the District line in trains per hour (tph) is as follows:

- 12 tph eastbound to Upminster
- 3 tph eastbound to Barking
- 3 tph eastbound to Tower Hill
- 6 tph westbound to Wimbledon
- 6 tph westbound to Ealing Broadway
- 6 tph westbound to Richmond

=== Circle line ===
On the Circle line, Victoria station is between Sloane Square to the west and St James's Park to the east, and shares track with the District line. The typical off-peak service on the Circle line in trains per hour (tph) is as follows:

- 6 tph clockwise to Edgware Road via High Street Kensington
- 6 tph anticlockwise to Hammersmith via Tower Hill, King's Cross St Pancras and Paddington

=== Victoria line ===
On the Victoria line, Victoria station is between Green Park to the north and Pimlico to the south. The typical off-peak service on the Victoria line in trains per hour (tph) is as follows:

- 26 tph northbound to Walthamstow Central
- 26 tph southbound to Brixton

There are also sidings to the south of the Victoria line platforms, and crossovers to the north of the platforms to enable the trains to terminate and turn around.

== Connections ==
The station has direct access to the concourse of London Victoria station, a terminus of the Brighton Main Line to Gatwick Airport and Brighton and the Chatham Main Line to Ramsgate and Dover via Chatham.

Victoria Coach Station is about 300 metres south-west of the station. It is the main London coach terminal and serves all parts of the UK and mainland Europe. The station is served by a large number of London Buses routes day and night, using Victoria bus station or neighbouring streets.
