= Oxford Circus tube station =

London Underground station

Oxford Circus
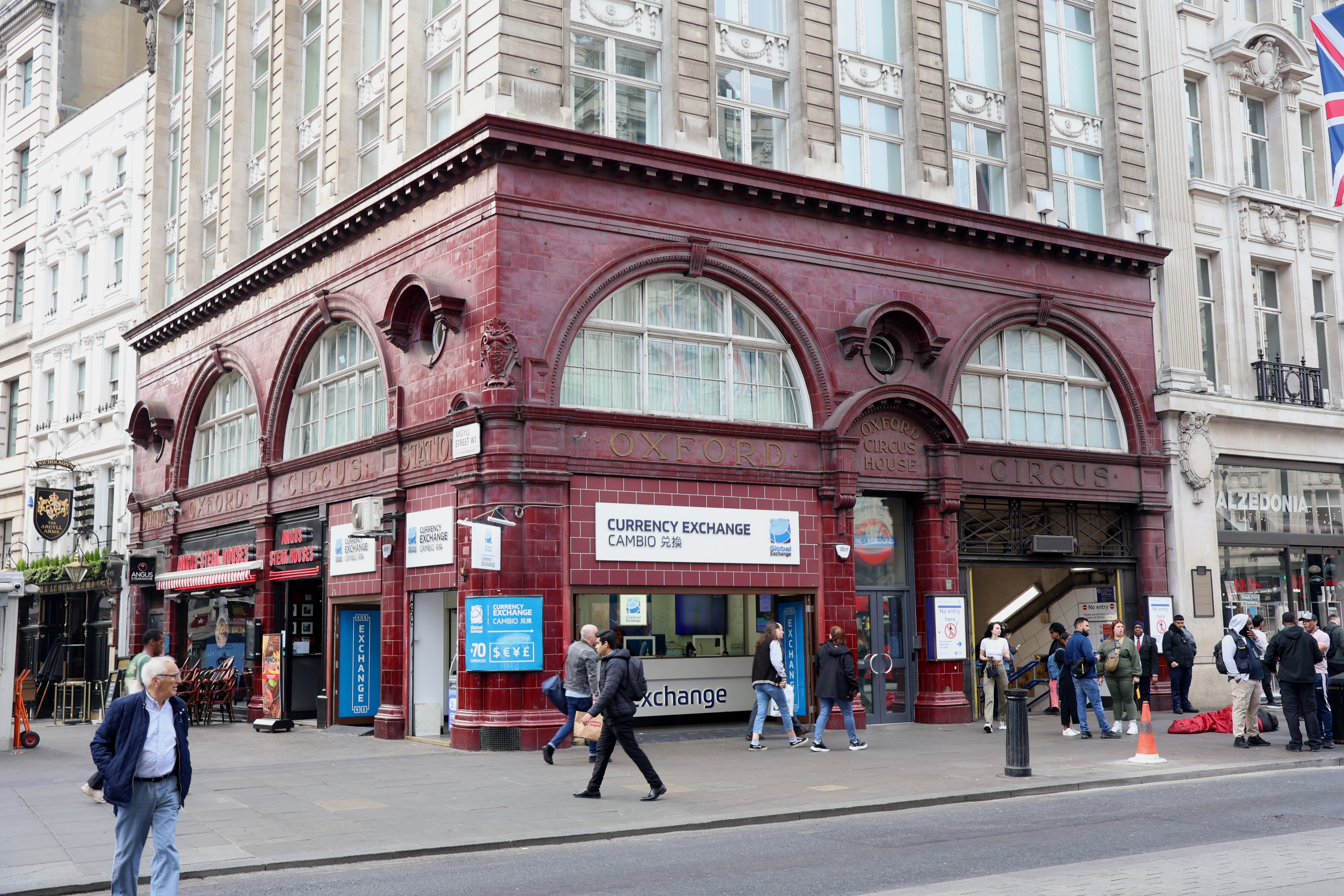
- Bakerloo line surface building
- Interactive map of Oxford Circus

General information
- Location: Oxford Circus
- Local authority: City of Westminster
- Managed by: London Underground
- Owner: Transport for London
- Number of platforms: 6
- Fare zone: 1
- OSI: Bond Street

London Underground annual entry and exit
- 2021: ▲32.86 million
- 2022: ▲54.02 million
- 2023: ▼51.11 million
- 2024: ▼50.94 million
- 2025: ▲52.34 million

Key dates
- 30 July 1900: CLR opened
- 10 March 1906: BS&WR opened
- 7 March 1969: Victoria line opened

Listed status
- Listed feature: Original CLR and BS&WR buildings.
- Listing grade: II
- Entry number: 1400976 (CLR); 1401022 (BS&WR)
- Added to list: 20 July 2011; 15 years ago

Other information
- External links: TfL station info page
- Coordinates: 51.5152°N 0.1416°W

Oxford Circus is a London Underground station in Central London. It serves Oxford Circus and is located at the junction of Regent Street and Oxford Street, with entrances on all four corners of the intersection. The station is served by three lines: Bakerloo, Central and Victoria. As of 2024, it was the fourth-busiest station on the London Underground; and as such access to the station is frequently restricted at peak times. On the Bakerloo line the station is between Regent's Park and Piccadilly Circus stations, on the Central line it is between Bond Street and Tottenham Court Road stations, and on the Victoria line it is between Green Park and Warren Street stations. It is in London fare zone 1.

The Central line station opened on 30 July 1900, and the Bakerloo line station on 10 March 1906. Both are Grade II listed. The station was rebuilt in 1912 to relieve congestion. Further congestion led to another reconstruction in 1923. Numerous improvements were made as part of the New Works Programme and as a flood protection measure. To accommodate additional passengers on the Victoria line, a new ticket hall was built. The Victoria line platforms opened on 7 March 1969, including cross-platform interchange with the Bakerloo line.

== History ==
=== Central line ===
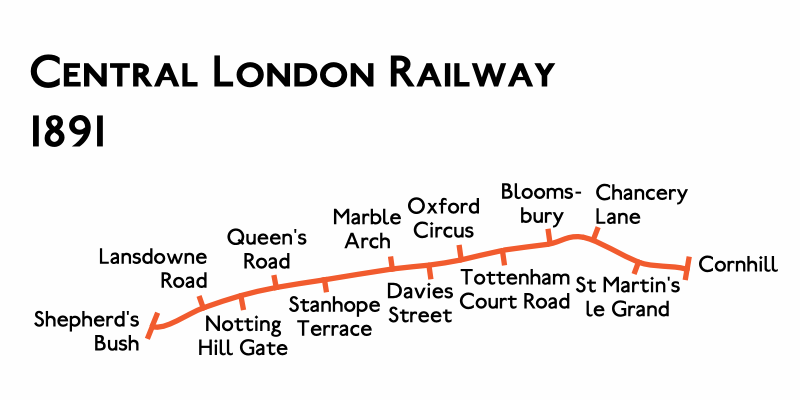
Route diagram showing the original route of the Central line between Shepherd's Bush and Bank (then known as Cornhill).

In the 1890s, the Central London Railway (CLR) published a notice of a private bill that would be presented to Parliament for the 1890 parliamentary session. The bill planned an underground route between Shepherd's Bush and Cornhill (now Bank station). (Note: The proposals faced strong objections from the Metropolitan and District Railways (MR and DR) whose routes on the Inner Circle, (now the Circle line, a sub-surface loop line operated jointly by the MR and the DR) to the north and the south respectively, the CLR route paralleled; and from which the new line was expected to take passengers.) These plans were accepted by both Houses of Parliament on 5 August 1891.

The CLR employed the engineers James Henry Greathead, Sir John Fowler, and Sir Benjamin Baker to design the railway. Tunnelling was completed by the end of 1898 and the official opening of the CLR (now the Central line) by the Prince of Wales took place on 27 June 1900; it was opened to the public on 30 July. Oxford Circus station opened as part of the first section of the line, between Shepherd's Bush and Bank. As part of the 1935—40 New Works Programme, the misaligned tunnels of the central section on the Central line that slowed running speeds were corrected (Note: The original tubes had a nominal diameter of 3.56 metres (11 ft 8 3/16 in) because a planned concrete lining to the cast iron tunnel rings was not installed. However, the tubes were not well aligned, and trains had to be significantly smaller than expected (the initial CLR locomotive was not able to fit into the tube until the rails had been replaced by shallower ones). Because of the way the tunnel was enlarged, it is no longer that round, and for clearance reasons the outside positive rail has a special shape and placed 4 centimetres (1 1/2 in) higher than usual.) and the platforms lengthened to accommodate longer trains.

=== Bakerloo line ===
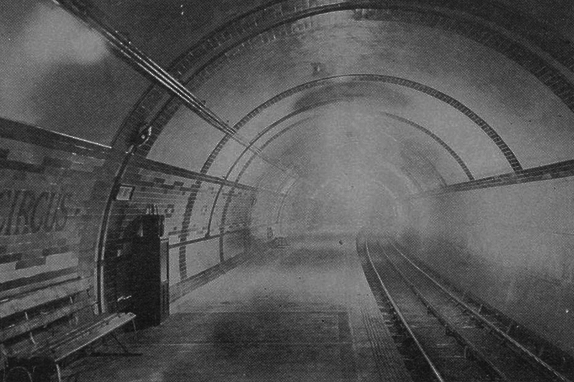
Bakerloo line platform, 1906

In November 1891, notice was given of a private bill that would be presented to Parliament for the construction of the Baker Street and Waterloo Railway (BS&WR, now the Bakerloo line). The railway was planned to run entirely underground from Marylebone to Elephant & Castle via Baker Street and Waterloo. The route was approved in 1900. Construction commenced in August 1898 under the direction of Sir Benjamin Baker, W.R. Galbraith and R.F. Church. The works were carried out by Perry & Company of Tregedar Works, Bow. Oxford Circus was altered below ground following a Board of Trade inspection; at the end of 1905, the first test trains began running. The official opening of the BS&WR by Sir Edwin Cornwall took place on 10 March 1906. The first section of the BS&WR was between Baker Street and Lambeth North, then known as Kennington Road.

=== Victoria line ===
A proposal for a new underground railway running from Victoria to Walthamstow was first proposed by a Working Party set up by the British Transport Commission in 1948, though that largely followed a 1946 plan for an East Croydon to Finsbury Park line. (Note: These plans include "Route 8 – South to North link from East Croydon to Finsbury Park", a main-line service running between Norbury and Hornsey in tunnel, a tube line running into north-east London between Coulsdon North or Sanderstead and Walthamstow (Hoe Street) or Waltham Cross. Several feasibility studies were carried out to form a combined route, "Route C" running between Walthamstow and Victoria via Oxford Circus.) A route was approved in 1955 with future extensions to be decided later, (Note: The route originally avoided Oxford Circus with alternatives via Bond Street and Tottenham Court Road stations. It was later noted that 'satisfactory cross-platform interchange' could be provided here, but only if the route is worked with a standard size tube stock, since there is restricted available space here.) though funding for the construction was not approved by the government until 1962. Construction began in 1962 on the initial Walthamstow to Victoria section, where cross-platform interchange was to be provided at Oxford Circus. The Victoria line platforms opened on 7 March 1969. The station opened as part of a second extension from Warren Street to Victoria. Cross-platform interchange between the Bakerloo and Victoria lines was provided by constructing the Victoria line platforms parallel to the Bakerloo ones.

=== Incidents and accidents ===
- On 13 February 1976, a 20–30 lb (9–14 kg) bomb left in a case at the station by the Provisional IRA was discovered and safely defused. The station, at the height of the afternoon rush hour, was evacuated.
- On 23 November 1984, during renovation works, the station suffered a severe fire which burned out the northbound Victoria line platform. It is believed that the fire was caused by smoking materials being pushed through a ventilation grille into a storeroom where they set several materials on fire. This caused the Victoria line between Warren Street and Victoria to be suspended until 18 December the same year. Smoking had been banned on underground trains the previous July, and the fire led to the ban being extended to all subsurface stations.
- On 3 March 1997, a train derailment caused the northbound Bakerloo line service between Piccadilly Circus and Oxford Circus to be suspended for 12 days.
- On 11 August 2017, a fire occurred on a Bakerloo Line train, which was evacuated at Oxford Circus. Services were suspended between Elephant and Castle and Paddington. A number of people were treated for smoke inhalation after the fire broke out.
- On 24 November 2017, a fight between passengers on the westbound Central line platform caused a mass panic and stampede that led to 16 injuries.

=== Renaming ===
In 2011, Australian winemaker Oxford Landing was in talks to 'rename' the station after its product, by changing the name on all signage; the deal eventually broke down due to intellectual property concerns over the London Underground logo, although TfL claimed the talks were only ever "informal".

== Station building ==
=== Bakerloo and Central lines ===
The CLR and BSWR had separate surface buildings and lift shafts. The station buildings, which remain today as exits from the station, were built on very confined plots on either side of Argyll Street on the south side of Oxford Street, just east of the circus itself. The stations as originally built were entirely separate, but connecting passages were soon provided at platform level. The surviving Central London Railway building to the east of Argyll Street is the best surviving example of stations designed by Harry Bell Measures, and the Bakerloo line building to the west is a classic Leslie Green structure. Both are Grade II listed since 20 July 2011.

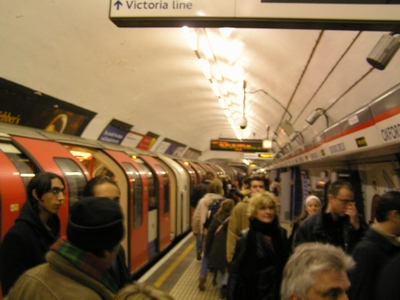
The busy Central line platform, as seen in December 2004, showing its narrow width.

Almost from the outset, overcrowding has been a constant problem, and there have been numerous improvements to the facilities and below-ground arrangements to deal with this. After much discussion between the then two separate operators, a major reconstruction began in 1912. This entailed a new ticket hall, serving both lines, being built in the basement of the Bakerloo station, with the Bakerloo lifts removed and new deep-level escalators opened down to the Bakerloo line level. Access to the CLR was by way of existing deep-level subways. The new works came into use on 9 May 1914 with the CLR lifts still available for passengers. By 1923 even this rearrangement was unable to cope, so a second rebuilding began. This involved a second set of escalators being built directly down to the Central line and the CLR station building becoming exit-only. On 2 October 1928, a third escalator leading to the Bakerloo platforms was opened. Unusually, lifts came back into prominence at an Underground station when, in 1942, a set of high-speed lifts came into use, largely used as an exit route from the Central line platforms directly to the Argyll Street exit building.

The station was closed between 31 August and 20 November 1939 to facilitate flood protection works for the preparation of The Second World War. Although street access was closed, trains still called, and interchange between the Bakerloo and Central lines was still possible within the station.

=== Victoria line ===
Station reconstruction to accommodate the Victoria line was described as the most time-consuming for the Victoria line project. (Note: The works were complex, as work had to be carried out while keeping the station open without upsetting the traffic above the worksite. As a result, lengthy access tunnels had to be built.) To handle the additional Victoria line passenger loads, a new ticket hall was constructed directly under the road junction. Separate banks of escalators to each line were to be built, the existing structure to be used as exits and the lifts to be removed. A new one-way interchange subways system was to be built between the Bakerloo/Victoria lines and the Central line. To excavate the new ticket hall below the roadway, traffic was diverted for five and a half years (August 1963 to Easter 1968) onto a temporary bridge-like structure known as the "umbrella" covering the Regent Street/Oxford Street intersection. It consisted of 245 pieces of separate prefabricated steel work. The deck plates were placed on top of a system of steel girders which in turn rested on 25 cylindrical 3-foot (0.91 m) diameter concrete foundations, sunk from 43 to 73 feet (13 to 22 m) deep at night. The cylindrical piles had to clear the sites of the main and secondary roof beams of the new ticket hall and various low-level obstructions. The piles had to be built with wide footings to avoid them from collapsing. Service tunnels were constructed to carry water mains and telecom cables past the new ticket hall. The umbrella deck was extended eastwards along Oxford Street to facilitate the construction of a connecting passageway between the old and new ticket halls during the weekend of the August Bank Holiday in 1966. Construction of the Victoria line station tunnels with their platforms, the new escalator shafts and the linking passages to the Central line platforms was carried out from access shafts sunk from nearby Cavendish Square, Upper Regent Street and Argyll Street. (Note: To this day, traffic passing through the Oxford Circus intersection travels directly over the roof of the ticket office.) For the construction of the southbound Victoria line platform tunnel, a special design of tunnel segment, fabricated with mild steel was adopted as there was limited space available for the construction of the platform tunnel. A pre-stressed concrete raft was constructed below the Peter Robinson's third basement level as an extra precaution against settlement before driving the platform tunnel. (Note: This would further reduce the risks of settlement during the time the tunnel face was passing below and spreading the load from the isolated foundation piles more uniformly over the tunnel-in effect making the tunnel itself the base of the foundation.) The interchange passageway between the Central line and the Bakerloo line in the area of the former junction with the Bakerloo line lift landing was replaced by the southbound Victoria line platform tunnel. (Note: The southbound line runs along the former entrance passageway and was connected to the abandoned stair shaft through the original cross passage to relieve congestion.) From there, a pilot tunnel Ventilation systems were rearranged with a new ventilation plant installed in the former Bakerloo line lift shaft. A new substation for the Bakerloo line was built at the bottom of the shaft. (Note: This was used as an example to fit in another at Holborn.) With the additional escalators in place, the one-way circulation scheme was introduced and the remaining lifts were removed.

== The station today ==
In 2007 the station underwent a major modernisation, removing the murals installed on the Central and Bakerloo line platforms in the 1980s and replacing them with plain white tiles, in a style similar to those used when the station opened in 1900. The wall tiling on the Bakerloo line platforms featured the station name and an individual geometric pattern and colour scheme designed by Leslie Green. One 1980s mural remains on one of the platforms. The Central line platform works were substantially complete and a new Station Operations Room at top level opened. This enabled the entire CCTV system to be switched over to new recordable digital technology. The original motifs designed by Hans Unger on the Victoria line platforms were restored, which were originally installed in 1969. These motifs symbolise the circle of the Oxford Circus junction, with the criss-crossed lines as the Bakerloo, Central and Victoria lines.

Oxford Circus station has 14 escalators. (Note: The escalators, however, do not descend directly down to the platforms.) Major escalator refurbishment took place in 2010–11. Platform humps were also installed at the station to provide level access from the platforms onto the trains. (Note: This project was in accordance with the Rail Vehicle Accessibility (Non Interoperable Rail System) Regulations 2010 and the Disability Discrimination Act 1995.) The Victoria line humps resemble in form the Harrington Hump.

=== Station architecture ===
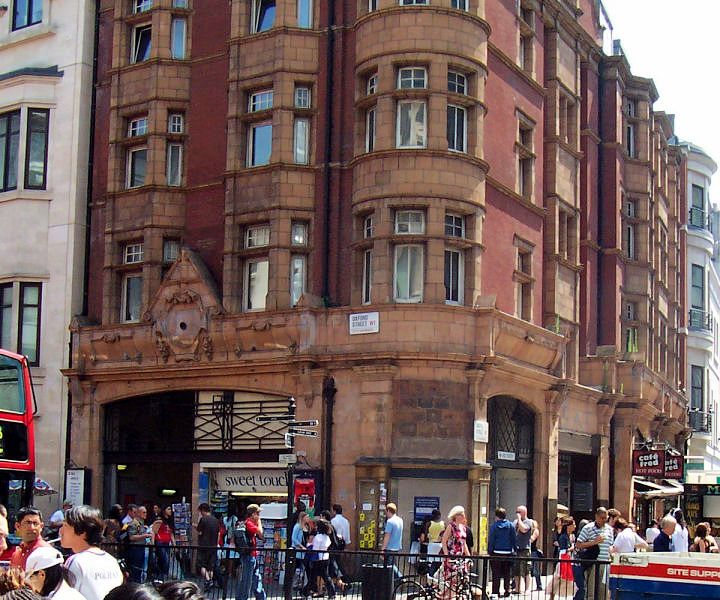
The exit at Oxford Circus station, designed by Harry Bell Measures.

On 20 July 2011, the separate station buildings were given Grade II status by the Tourism and Heritage Minister on the advice of English Heritage. Part of the reason was the consistency of the design shown by architect Leslie Green on several stations. (Note: The other stations which were designed by Leslie Green that got listed are Aldwych, Belsize Park, Caledonian Road, Chalk Farm and Covent Garden.)

The station building on the northeast corner of Argyll Street and Oxford Street was designed by Harry Bell Measures. The upper storey offices designed by Delissa Joseph were later added in 1908. The building as a whole was described as a "vigorous and well-detailed composition" and the best preserved. This design of the station resembles the traditional design of a Central London Railway (CLR) station. The materials used are of pinkish-buff terracotta and red brick with slate roof. The detailed description of the facade is quoted below: (Note: The four-storey office is of a Flemish Renaissance style build. It used red bricks, and contains window bays in buff terracotta to fit in with the base building. The round corner has a conical roof and transom windows.)

"Wholly terracotta-clad with Mannerist detailing: pilasters flanking the entrances have capitals broken by masks and scroll brackets, supporting a cornice and frieze with moulded swags and cornucopias. Short elevation to Oxford Street contains main entrance (now exit), a broad segmental archway, originally glazed with timber mullions and now containing an openwork transom panel with diamond bracing. Large cartouche above rising into a gable, its cherub finial now lost. Long elevation to Argyll Street has two smaller segment-headed entrances, that to left cut down from an original window, and between them two similar openings containing shops. In centre, narrower doorway with glazed overlight gives access to upper floors. Curved corner section contains a metal-framed kiosk with bowed side sections bearing monograms, added before 1927 and now blocked."

Opposite the Measures's building, the original two-storey Bakerloo line entrance was designed by Leslie Green which resembles the original architecture of the Baker Street and Waterloo Railway (BS&WR) stations. It is the only station to have the original tiled signage and a cartouche bearing the Underground Electric Railways (UERL) company insignia retained. Like other original BS&WR station designs, it features ox-blood red terracotta and a brick-clad steel frame. The terracotta was manufactured by Leeds Fireclay Co. Ltd. Unlike the other building, the offices above are not Grade II listed. The station name is carved with raised gilded lettering on the lower frieze to Argyll Street and Oxford Street.

== Services and connections ==
=== Services ===
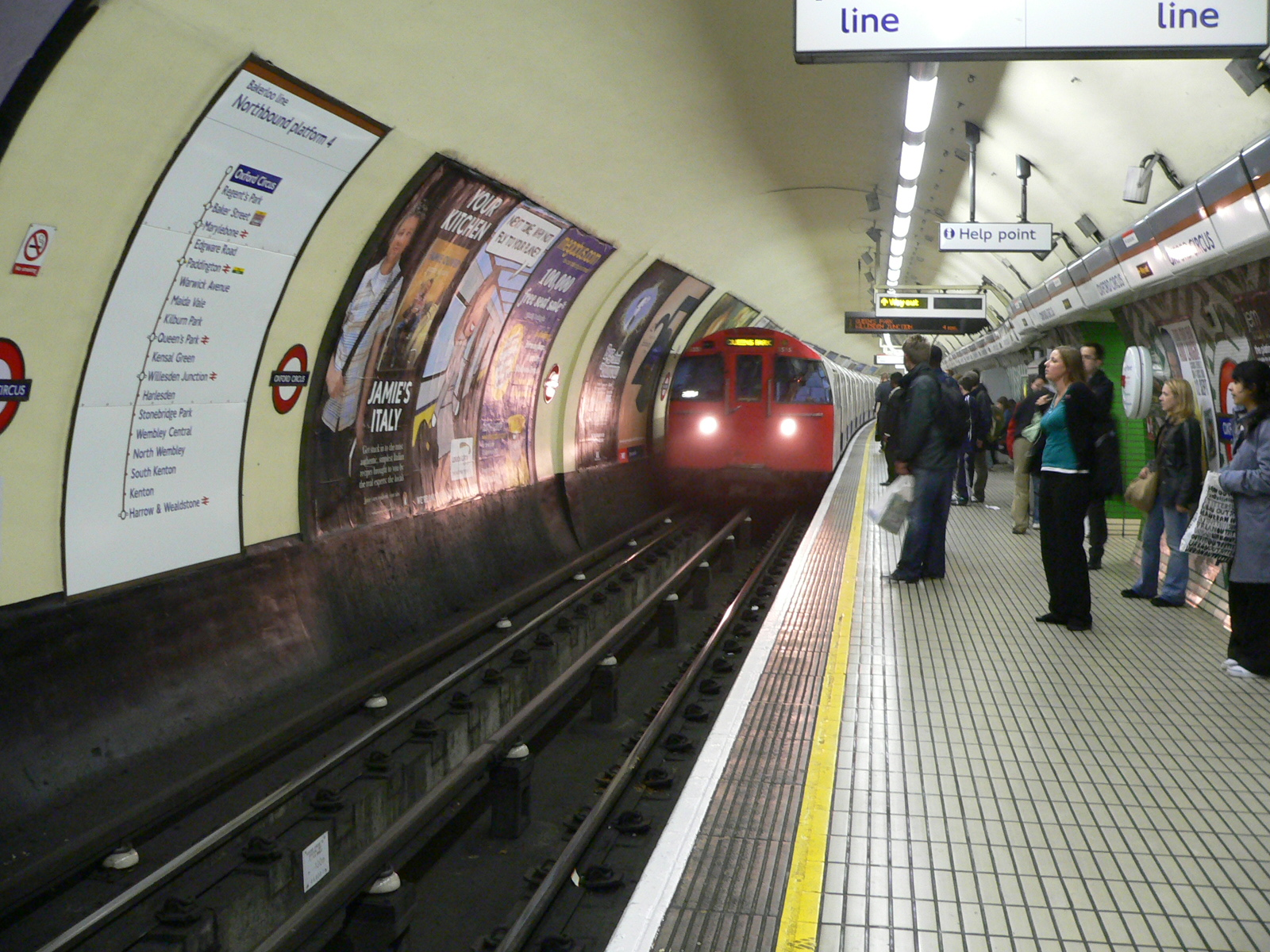
A Bakerloo line train to Queen's Park arriving at northbound platform 4, looking south

==== Bakerloo line ====
On the Bakerloo line, Oxford Circus station is between Regent’s Park to the north and Piccadilly Circus to the south. The typical off-peak service in trains per hour (tph) operating during off-peak hours weekdays and all day Sunday is as follows:

- 8 tph northbound to Queen's Park
- 4 tph northbound to Stonebridge Park (via Queen's Park)
- 4 tph northbound to Harrow & Wealdstone (via Queen's Park and Stonebridge Park)
- 16 tph southbound to Elephant & Castle

==== Central line ====
On the Central line, Oxford Circus station is between Bond Street to the west and Tottenham Court Road to the east. Trains generally run between West Ruislip and Epping, and between Ealing Broadway and Hainault (via Newbury Park), with some trains on the latter route continuing to Woodford via Grange Hill. The general frequency between trains is 3–10 minutes.

Night Tube services on Friday and Saturday nights generally operate 6tph in each direction. The typical night tube service as of 2018 in trains per hour (tph) is:

- 3 tph eastbound to Hainault via Newbury Park
- 3 tph eastbound to Loughton
- 3 tph westbound to Ealing Broadway
- 3 tph westbound to White City

==== Victoria line ====
On the Victoria line, Oxford Circus station is between Green Park to the south and Warren Street to the north. The typical off-peak service in trains per hour (tph) is 27 trains per hour in each direction to Brixton and Walthamstow Central, with reduced frequencies of six trains per hour during Night Tube operations.

Preceding station	London Underground	Following station
Regent's Park towards Harrow & Wealdstone	Bakerloo line	Piccadilly Circus towards Elephant & Castle
Bond Street towards Ealing Broadway or West Ruislip	Central line	Tottenham Court Road towards Epping, Hainault or Woodford via Newbury Park
Green Park towards Brixton	Victoria line	Warren Street towards Walthamstow Central

=== Connections ===
A large number of London Buses serve the station and the local area, day and night.

== Nearby attractions ==
- All Souls Church, Langham Place
- BBC Broadcasting House
- Carnaby Street
- Langham Hotel
- London College of Fashion, John Princes Street
- London Palladium, Argyll Street
- Oxford Street
- Regent Street
  - Hamleys
- St George's, Hanover Square
