= List of stations in London fare zone 1 =

Fare zone 1 is the central zone of Transport for London's zonal fare system used by the London Underground, London Overground, Docklands Light Railway (DLR) and National Rail. For most tickets, travel through Zone 1 is more expensive than journeys of similar length not crossing this zone. The zone contains all the central London districts, most of the major tourist attractions, the major rail terminals, the City of London, and the West End. It is about 6 miles (10 km) from west to east and 4 miles (6 km) from north to south, approximately 17 square miles (45 km^{2}).

== Background ==
Map of Zone 1 Underground stations, pre 2021

London is split into six approximately concentric zones. Zone 1 covers the West End, the Holborn district, Kensington, Paddington and the City of London, as well as Old Street, Angel, Pimlico, Tower Gateway, Aldgate East, Euston, Vauxhall, Elephant & Castle, Borough, London Bridge, Earl's Court, Marylebone, Edgware Road, Lambeth North and Waterloo. Every London Underground line has stations in zone 1. Underground stations within this zone are typically close together; for instance Covent Garden and Leicester Square are only 0.3 kilometres (0.2 mi) apart, the shortest distance between any two stations in the network. The zone originates from two central London zones that were created on 4 October 1981 named City and West End, in which flat fares applied, replaced in 1983 by Zone 1.

== List of stations ==
The following stations are in zone 1, and were in the 1981–1983 City and West End zones as shown:

Station	Local authority	Managed by	1981 to 1983	Notes
Aldgate	City of London	London Underground	City	
Aldgate East	Tower Hamlets	London Underground	City	
Angel	Islington	London Underground	City	
Baker Street	Westminster	London Underground	West End	
Bank	City of London	London Underground	City	
Barbican	City of London	London Underground	City	
Battersea Power Station	Wandsworth	London Underground	N/A	
Bayswater	Westminster	London Underground	West End	
Blackfriars LU	City of London	London Underground	City	
Blackfriars NR	City of London	Thameslink	N/A	
Bond Street	Westminster	London Underground	West End	
Borough	Southwark	London Underground	City	
Cannon Street LU	City of London	London Underground	City	
Cannon Street NR	City of London	Network Rail	N/A	
Chancery Lane	Camden	London Underground	City	
Charing Cross LU	Westminster	London Underground	Both	
Charing Cross NR	Westminster	Network Rail	N/A	
City Thameslink	City of London	Thameslink	N/A	
Covent Garden	Westminster	London Underground	Both	
Earl's Court	Kensington & Chelsea	London Underground	West End	Also in zone 2
Edgware Road (Bakerloo)	Westminster	London Underground	West End	
Edgware Road (Circle)	Westminster	London Underground	West End	
Elephant & Castle LU	Southwark	London Underground	City	Also in zone 2
Elephant & Castle NR	Southwark	Thameslink	N/A	Also in zone 2
Embankment	Westminster	London Underground	Both	
Euston NR	Camden	Network Rail	N/A	
Euston LU	Camden	London Underground	Both	
Euston Square	Camden	London Underground	Both	
Farringdon	Islington	London Underground	City	
Fenchurch Street	City of London	c2c	N/A	
Gloucester Road	Kensington & Chelsea	London Underground	West End	
Goodge Street	Camden	London Underground	Both	
Great Portland Street	Westminster	London Underground	West End	
Green Park	Westminster	London Underground	West End	
High Street Kensington	Kensington & Chelsea	London Underground	West End	
Holborn	Camden	London Underground	Both	
Hoxton	Hackney	London Overground	N/A	Also in zone 2
Hyde Park Corner	Westminster	London Underground	West End	
Kennington	Southwark	London Underground	N/A	Also in zone 2
King's Cross NR	Camden	Network Rail	N/A	
King's Cross St Pancras LU	Camden	London Underground	Both	
Knightsbridge	Kensington & Chelsea	London Underground	West End	
Lambeth North	Lambeth	London Underground	Both	
Lancaster Gate	Westminster	London Underground	West End	
Leicester Square	Westminster	London Underground	Both	
Liverpool Street LU	City of London	London Underground	City	
Liverpool Street NR	City of London	Network Rail	N/A	
London Bridge LU	Southwark	London Underground	City	
London Bridge NR	Southwark	Network Rail	N/A	
Mansion House	City of London	London Underground	City	
Marble Arch	Westminster	London Underground	West End	
Marylebone LU	Westminster	London Underground	West End	
Marylebone NR	Westminster	Chiltern Railways	N/A	
Monument	City of London	London Underground	City	
Moorgate	City of London	London Underground	City	
Nine Elms	Lambeth	London Underground	N/A	
Notting Hill Gate	Kensington & Chelsea	London Underground	West End	Also in zone 2
Old Street	Islington	London Underground	City	
Oxford Circus	Westminster	London Underground	West End	
Paddington (Bakerloo, Circle and District)	Westminster	London Underground	West End	
Paddington (Circle and Hammersmith & City)	Westminster	London Underground	West End	
Paddington NR	Westminster	Network Rail	N/A	
Piccadilly Circus	Westminster	London Underground	West End	
Pimlico	Westminster	London Underground	West End	
Queensway	Westminster	London Underground	West End	
Regent's Park	Westminster	London Underground	West End	
Russell Square	Camden	London Underground	Both	
Shoreditch High Street	Hackney	London Overground	N/A	
Sloane Square	Kensington & Chelsea	London Underground	West End	
South Kensington	Kensington & Chelsea	London Underground	West End	
Southwark	Southwark	London Underground	N/A	
St James's Park	Westminster	London Underground	West End	
St Pancras International	Camden	Network Rail	N/A	
St Paul's	City of London	London Underground	City	
Temple	Westminster	London Underground	Both	
Tottenham Court Road	Westminster	London Underground	Both	
Tower Gateway	City of London	DLR	N/A	
Tower Hill	Tower Hamlets	London Underground	City	
Vauxhall LU	Lambeth	London Underground	West End	Also in zone 2
Vauxhall NR	Lambeth	South Western Railway	N/A	Also in zone 2
Victoria LU	Westminster	London Underground	West End	
Victoria NR	Westminster	Network Rail	N/A	
Warren Street	Camden	London Underground	Both	
Waterloo East	Lambeth	Southeastern	N/A	
Waterloo LU	Lambeth	London Underground	Both	
Waterloo NR	Lambeth	Network Rail	N/A	
Westminster	Westminster	London Underground	Both	

== Changes ==
- April 2010: Addition of Shoreditch High Street
- May 2021: Kennington from Zone 2 to Zone 1/2 boundary
- 20 September 2021: Addition of Battersea Power Station and Nine Elms

== See also ==
- List of London Underground stations
- List of London railway stations
- List of Docklands Light Railway stations
- List of busiest London Underground stations
- London Underground stations that are listed buildings
