= Paddington tube station =

Paddington tube station may refer to one of two London Underground stations serving Paddington mainline station that are shown as a single station on the tube map:

- Paddington tube station (Bakerloo, Circle and District lines)
- Paddington tube station (Circle and Hammersmith & City lines)
