= Bond Street station =

London Underground and Elizabeth line station

Bond Street
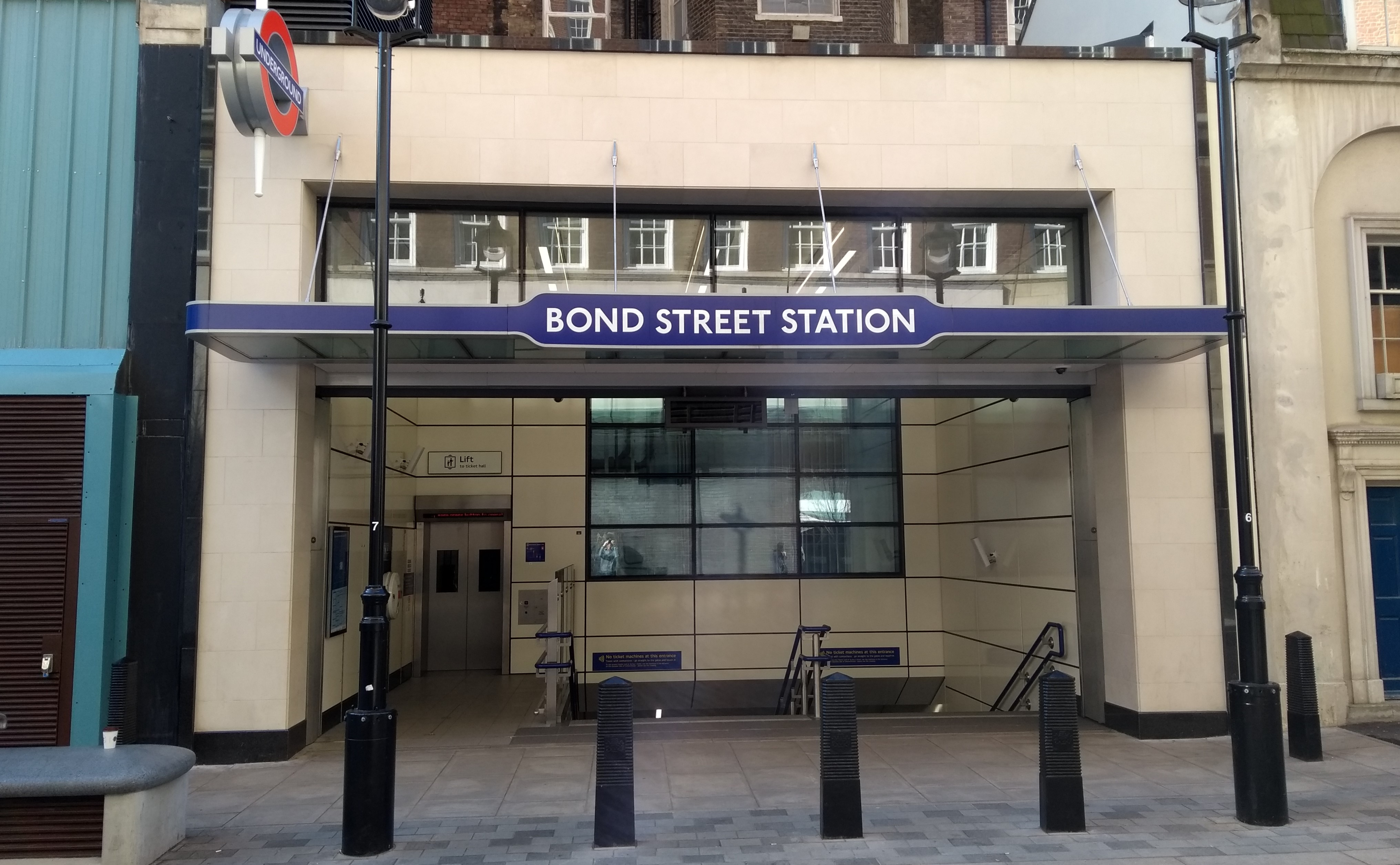
- Entrance on Marylebone Lane, which opened in 2017, as seen in February 2018
- Interactive map of Bond Street

General information
- Location: Mayfair
- Local authority: City of Westminster
- Managed by: London Underground
- Owner: Transport for London
- Station code: BDS
- Number of platforms: 6
- Accessible: Yes
- Fare zone: 1
- OSI: Oxford Circus

London Underground annual entry and exit
- 2021: ▲15.69 million
- 2022: ▲35.41 million
- 2023: ▲37.42 million
- 2024: ▲39.39 million
- 2025: ▲42.30 million

National Rail annual entry and exit
- 2022–23: 19.400 million
- 2023–24: ▲38.308 million
- 2024–25: ▲42.752 million

Key dates
- 24 September 1900: Opened (Central line)
- 1 May 1979: Opened (Jubilee line)
- 24 October 2022: Opened (Elizabeth line)

Other information
- External links: Departures; Facilities
- Coordinates: 51.514°N 0.15°W

Bond Street is an interchange station in Mayfair, in the West End of London for London Underground and Elizabeth line services. Entrances are on Oxford Street, near its junction with New Bond Street, and on Hanover Square.

The London Underground station is served by the Central and Jubilee lines. On the Central line, the station is between Marble Arch and Oxford Circus stations. On the Jubilee line, it is between Baker Street and Green Park stations. The Elizabeth line station is between Paddington and Tottenham Court Road stations.

Bond Street is in London fare zone 1.

== History ==
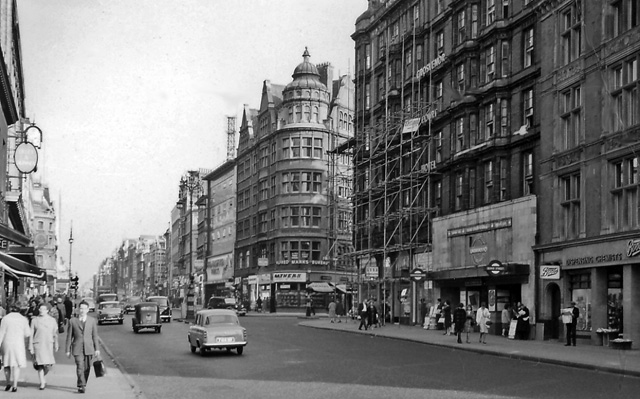
Station entrance in 1961

The station was first opened on 24 September 1900 by the Central London Railway, three months after the first stations on the Central line opened. The surface building was designed, in common with all original CLR stations, by the architect Harry Bell Measures. The original plans for the railway named the station as Davies Street rather than Bond Street.

In 1920 a possible joint venture was considered by London Underground and the nearby Selfridges store. This would have involved rebuilding the station, to include an entrance in Selfridge's basement. The idea was revisited in the early 1930s, leading to a concept of a subway connecting the station to the store, with a new ticket office in the basement of Selfridge's. However, these plans were not pursued, probably due to the cost of the construction.

The station has had several major reconstructions. The first, which saw the original lifts replaced by escalators, and the addition of a new sub-surface ticket hall and new station façade, designed by the architect Charles Holden, came into use on 8 June 1926. The tiling to the new ticket hall used the same tiling scheme used by Holden on other station projects at the time (notably the extension of the City and South London Railway to Morden).

=== Jubilee line era ===
In the 1970s, the Jubilee line was extended through central London to Charing Cross, via Bond Street. As part of the construction of the line, the station ticket hall was extended and new entrances were provided on the north side of Oxford Street and to the east of Davies Street. The Holden facade was demolished along with the Grosvenor Court Hotel that occupied the corner of Oxford Street and Davies Street, being replaced by the "West One" shopping arcade with offices above. The Jubilee line opened on 1 May 1979.

In 2007, the station underwent a visual modernisation, removing the murals installed on the Central line platforms in the 1980s and replacing them with plain white tiles, in a style similar to those used when the station opened in 1900.

=== 21st century ===
In the 2010s, the station was upgraded and expanded in preparation for the arrival of the Elizabeth line, bringing Bond Street into the National Rail network. As part of these works, the Central line platforms closed from April to June 2014, and the Jubilee line platforms closed from July to December 2014.

The £300m upgrade increased the capacity of the station entrances and exits by 30 per cent, added a new entrance to the station on Marylebone Lane on the north side of Oxford Street, and installed lifts to make the station step-free. It was completed in November 2017, prior to the completion of the Elizabeth line.

During London Fashion Week in September 2023, TfL temporarily renamed the station to Burberry Street, as a publicity stunt for the fashion company, Burberry. TfL were paid £200,000 by Burberry, and the name was reverted to Bond Street at the end of the fashion week. The renaming of the station was criticised by disability campaign group Transport for All as "messing around" and as "thoughtless PR stunts", with members of the public also complaining to TfL about confusing signage.

==== Elizabeth line ====
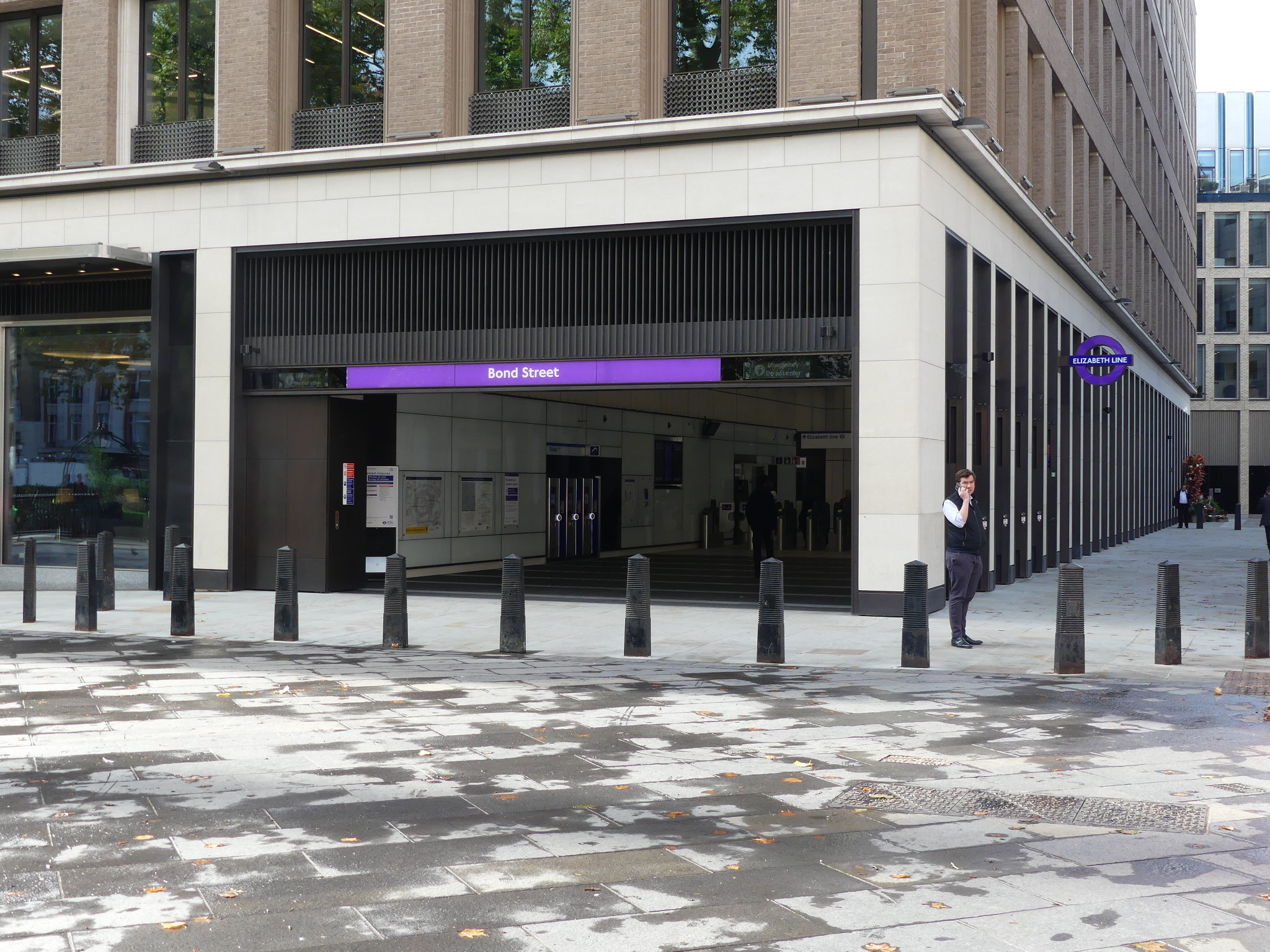
Elizabeth line entrance on Hanover Square, which opened in 2022

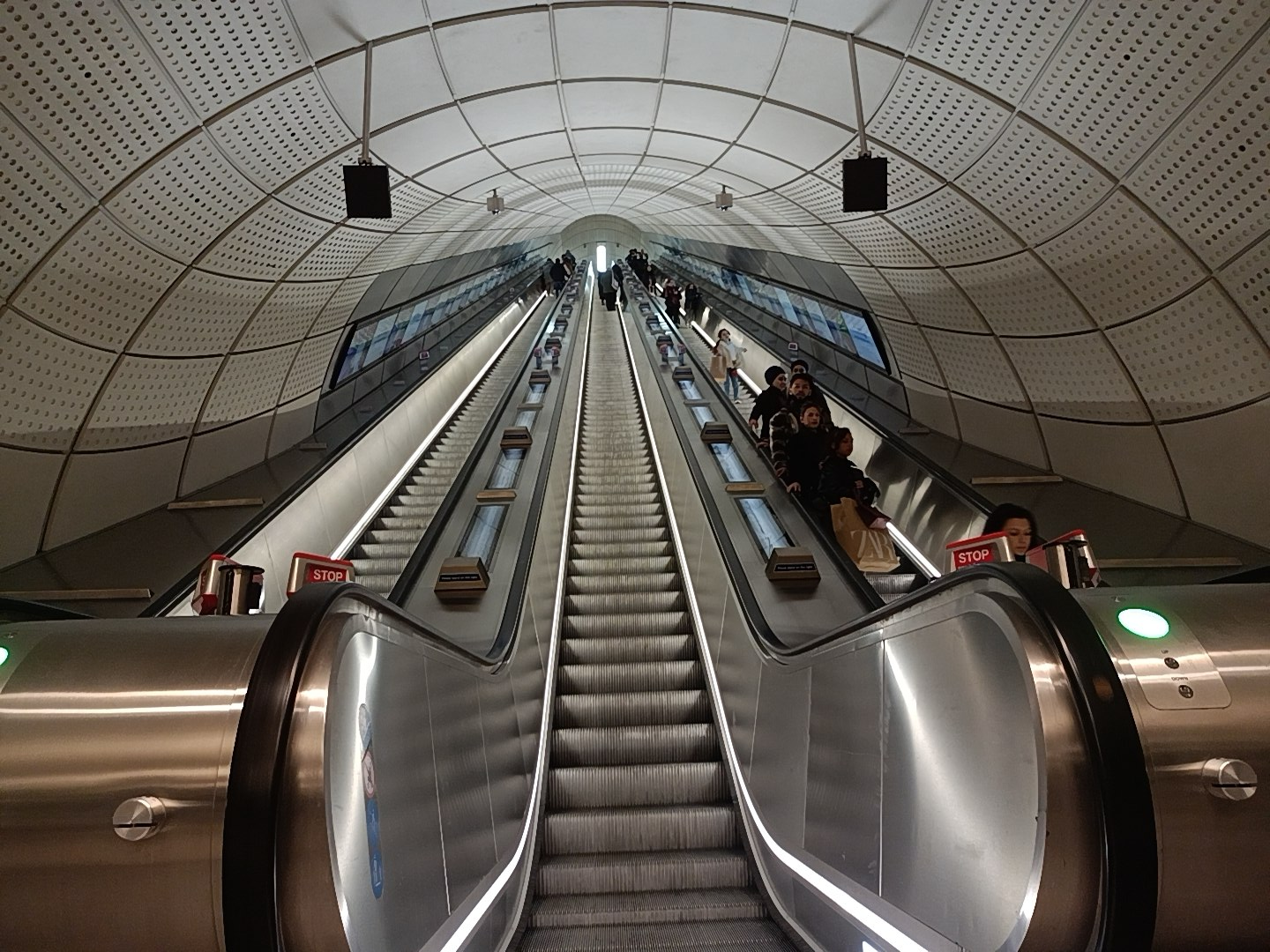
The escalators to the Hanover Square entrance, the longest on the Elizabeth line

Between 2009 and 2022, the Crossrail project built a new Elizabeth line station at Bond Street. Originally planned to open in 2018, Bond Street did not open with the rest of the central London Elizabeth line stations in May 2022, due to tunnelling problems dating back to 2014. The various delays meant that the station was approximately £500m over budget.

The Elizabeth line station was opened on 24 October 2022 by the Mayor of London, Sadiq Khan.

Two new ticket halls were built by Crossrail at Davies Street and Hanover Square. Architects included John McAslan and Lifschutz Davidson Sandilands. Although there is no connecting corridor, the Hanover Square exit of the Bond Street Elizabeth line station is approximately 250 m (270 yd) from Oxford Circus tube station and out-of-station interchange is permitted, allowing interchange with the Bakerloo and Victoria lines. The escalators to the Hanover Square exit, at 60 m (200 ft) are the longest on the Elizabeth line, and the second longest on the Transport for London (TfL) network, 1 m (3 ft 3 in) shorter than those at Angel station on the Northern line.

== Services ==
Services at Bond Street are operated by the Elizabeth line, and the Central and Jubilee lines of the London Underground.

The typical off-peak service in trains per hour (tph) is:

Operator/line	Frequency to destination
London Underground; Central line	Westbound; 3 tph to White City; 9 tph to Ealing Broadway; 3 tph to Northolt; 9 tph to West Ruislip
London Underground; Central line	Eastbound; 3 tph to Newbury Park; 9 tph to Hainault; 3 tph to Loughton; 9 tph to Epping
London Underground; Jubilee line	Northbound; 4 tph to West Hampstead; 4 tph to Willesden Green; 4 tph to Wembley Park; 12 tph to Stanmore
London Underground; Jubilee line	Southbound; 24 tph to Stratford
Elizabeth line	Westbound; 6 tph to London Paddington; 4 tph to Heathrow Terminal 4; 2 tph to Heathrow Terminal 5; 2 tph to Maidenhead; 2 tph to Reading
Elizabeth line	Eastbound; 8 tph to Abbey Wood; 8 tph to Shenfield

The station also served by a night service on Friday and Saturday nights as part of the Night Tube. The station is served by Central and Jubilee line trains every 10 minutes in each direction.

Preceding station	London Underground	Following station
Marble Arch towards Ealing Broadway or West Ruislip	Central line	Oxford Circus towards Epping, Hainault or Woodford via Newbury Park
Baker Street towards Stanmore	Jubilee line	Green Park towards Stratford
Preceding station	Elizabeth line	Following station
Paddington towards Reading or Heathrow Airport Terminal 4 or Terminal 5	Elizabeth line	Tottenham Court Road towards Abbey Wood or Shenfield

== Artwork ==
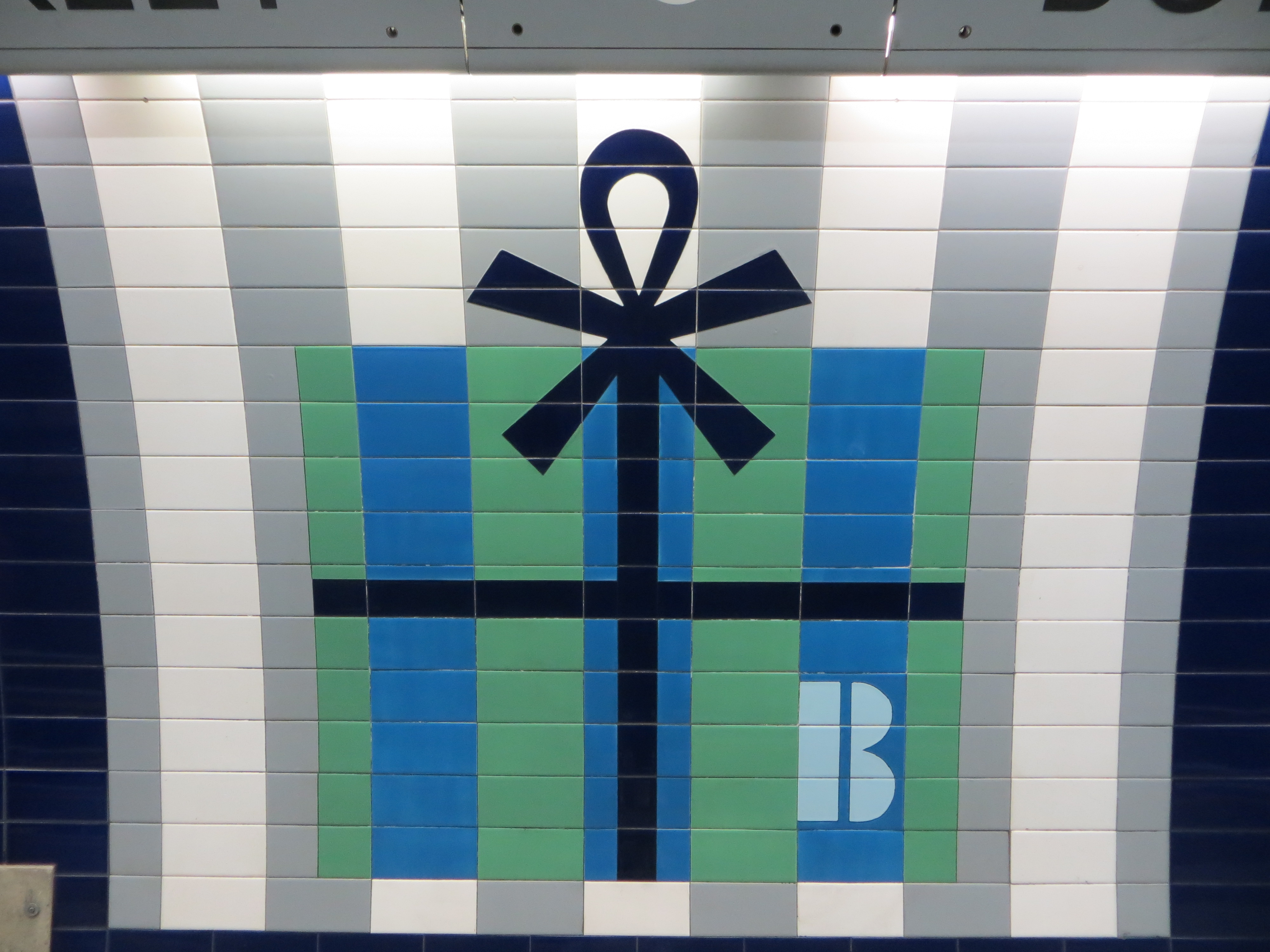
Tile motif by Tom Eckersley

The station features multiple pieces of artwork. On the Jubilee line platforms, Tom Eckersley designed a stylised "hat box" motif. The Elizabeth line station has three artworks by British artist Darren Almond. Located in and around the western Davies Street entrance, these artworks reference nameplates attached to railway locomotives.

== Cultural references ==
The westbound Central line platform of the station is featured on the cover art for The Jam's 1978 single "Down in the Tube Station at Midnight", with the band standing at the end of the platform as a 1962 Stock train rushes into the station.

== Nearby places of interest ==
- Bond Street
- Claridge's Hotel
- Handel House Museum, Brook Street
- Wallace Collection, Manchester Square
- Wigmore Hall, Wigmore Street
