= Roland Paoletti =

British-Italian architect (1931–2013)

Roland Paoletti CBE
- Born: Romano Roland Paoletti; 23 April 1931; London, England
- Died: 13 November 2013 (aged 82); London, England
- Occupation: Architect
- Projects: Jubilee Line Extension

Romano Roland Paoletti CBE (23 April 1931 – 13 November 2013) was a British-Italian architect. He was best known for his work on the early stations for Hong Kong's Mass Transit Railway, and for commissioning the award-winning designs of the stations of London Underground's Jubilee Line Extension. He was described by the Architectural Review as "the Medici of London Transport".

== Early life and career ==
Paoletti was born in London in 1931, at the City of London Hospital. His father was Italian and his mother French. The name Romano came from a church local to Lucca, Italy, where his father's family are thought to have lived for at least 700 years.

His father was treated as an enemy alien in the Second World War and the family had to move to Scotland. In 1942, Paoletti was sent to Clongowes Wood College, a Jesuit boarding school in County Kildare, Ireland. From 1948 he studied architecture at the University of Manchester, then moved to London to work with Basil Spence. After this he undertook postgraduate studies at the Istituto Universitario di Architettura in Venice under Carlo Scarpa and Giancarlo De Carlo. He became an assistant to Pier Luigi Nervi on the building of a new British Embassy in Rome to a design by Spence.

== Hong Kong ==
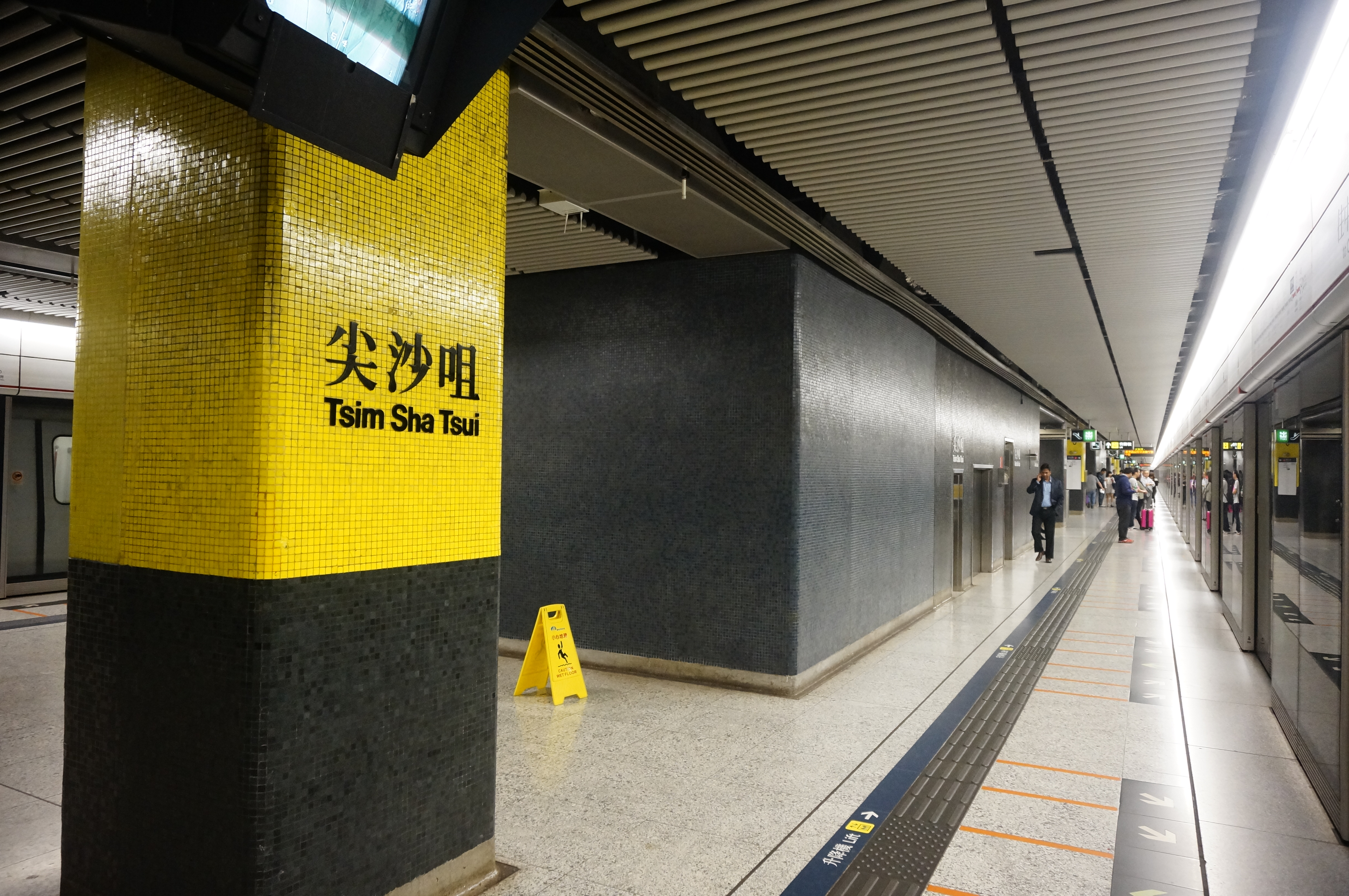
Tsim Sha Tsui station is one of the 37 MTR stations in Hong Kong for which Paoletti was responsible.

Paoletti later moved to Hong Kong, working at Palmer and Turner before becoming an architect at the rapidly expanding Mass Transit Railway (MTR) in 1975. He became chief architect in the MTR's programme to build a new urban transport system.

Over a period of twelve years, Paoletti led a team that designed 37 stations on the Tsuen Wan, Kwun Tong and Island lines across Hong Kong completing the initial phase of the MTR. Paoletti was responsible for key design decisions that now form part of the MTR's design identity – the use of a single colour throughout a station, the use of mosaic tiles, and oversized calligraphy of the station name.

The use of individual colours for each station was thought to give each station a unique identity, as well as assisting illiterate passengers. According to MTR's chief architect Andrew Mead, the colours were often chosen based on the Cantonese names of the station – such as Choi Hung (Rainbow) and Lam Tin (blue).

== Jubilee Line Extension ==
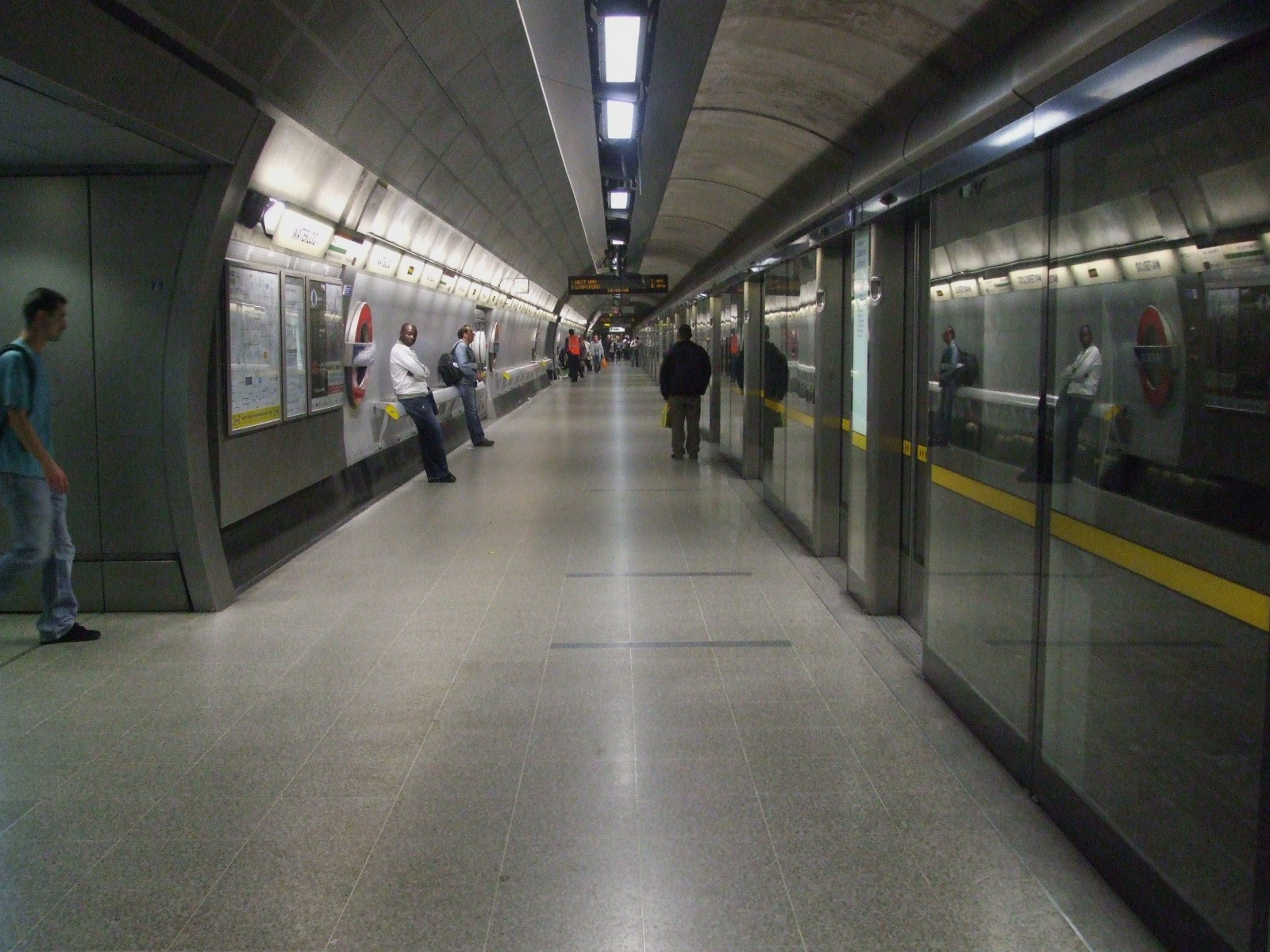
Paoletti's own in-house team worked on the Jubilee Line station at Waterloo, where he summarised the aim as "No contrivance – clarity is all".

In 1990, Sir Wilfrid Newton, chairman of the MTR, left Hong Kong to become chairman of London Regional Transport, which Paoletti joined him in London as commissioning architect for the new stations as part of the 10 miles (16 km) Jubilee Line Extension.

There had been plans to extend the London Underground's Jubilee line for many years. The final route for the extension involved eleven stations: Westminster, Waterloo, Southwark, London Bridge, Bermondsey, Canada Water, Canary Wharf, North Greenwich, Canning Town, West Ham and Stratford, plus a new depot at Stratford.

Since the 1930s, London Underground's architects had designed the surface buildings, but the sub-surface spaces were designed by civil engineers and only fitted out by the architects. Paoletti hired different architects to design each station, while maintaining that all should share an "underlying philosophy and essential elements." His own in-house architect team coordinated the work of the various architect teams, as well working on Waterloo and Canada Water stations.

Station	London borough	Infrastructure	Architects
Westminster	Westminster	new ticket hall and two additional deep-level platforms	Hopkins Architects
Waterloo	Lambeth	new ticket hall and two additional deep-level platforms	JLE Project Architects
Southwark	Southwark	new station with two deep-level platforms	MacCormac, Jamieson, Prichard
London Bridge	Southwark	new ticket hall and two additional deep-level platforms	Weston Williamson and JLE Project Architects
Bermondsey	Southwark	new station with two deep-level platforms	Ian Ritchie
Canada Water	Southwark	new station with two deep-level platforms and two new sub-surface platforms on East London Line	JLE Project Architects and Heron Associates
Canada Water	Southwark	new bus station	Eva Jiřičná
Canary Wharf	Tower Hamlets	new station with two deep-level platforms	Foster + Partners
North Greenwich	Greenwich	new station with three deep-level platforms	Alsop, Lyall and Störmer
North Greenwich	Greenwich	new bus station	Foster + Partners
Canning Town	Newham	new station with two surface platforms, two new elevated platforms for the DLR and two surface platforms for the North London line, new bus station	Troughton McAslan
West Ham	Newham	new station building with two additional surface platforms	Van Heyningen and Haward Architects
Stratford	Newham	New station building and plaza	WilkinsonEyre
Stratford	Newham	Three additional surface platforms and train crew building	Troughton McAslan

== Recognition ==
Many of the Jubilee line stations received individual awards and commendations for their architecture, including Westminster and Canary Wharf being jointly awarded the 2000 Civic Trust Building of the Year. The Royal Fine Art Commission named the extension as a whole their Millennium Building of the Year, with the chair of the judging panel calling it "comparable to the achievement of Haussmann when he constructed the great boulevards of Paris". Paoletti himself received the RIBA/Arts Council Award for "Client of the Year" 1999.

Paoletti won first RIBA Client of the Year award in 1998, and was appointed a Commander of the Order of the British Empire (CBE) in the 2000 New Year Honours for "services to Architecture". The Architectural Review called him "the Medici of London Transport".

He died in London. He was survived by his wife, Nora. They had no children.
