= Wilfrid Newton =

Former transport executive in London and Hong Kong

Sir Wilfrid Newton CBE HonFREng
- Newton as chairman of the Mass Transit Railway Corporation in 1986
- Born: 11 December 1928; South Africa
- Died: 28 November 2012 (aged 83)
- Occupation(s): Managing Director of Mass Transit Railway Corporation: 1983–1989; Chairman of London Regional Transport: 1989–1994

Sir Charles Wilfrid Newton (11 December 1928 – 28 November 2012) was the managing director of Hong Kong's Mass Transit Railway Corporation (MTRC) in the 1980s and chairman of London Regional Transport in the 1990s.

== History ==
Charles Wilfrid Newton was born on 11 December 1928 in South Africa, and was educated at schools in Johannesburg and the University of the Witwatersrand. Starting out as an accountant in industry, he became group managing director, and subsequently the chief executive of Turner & Newall.

=== Hong Kong and MTR ===
In March 1983, Newton left Turner & Newall to join the Hong Kong's Mass Transit Railway Corporation (MTRC) as chairman and chief executive. The MTR was founded in 1975 as a government owned statutory corporation to build and operate a mass transit system for the then British colony. The MTR had just opened its first railway line connecting Hong Kong Island to Kowloon in 1979.

Newton led the building of a new line on Hong Kong island itself – the Island line, which connected the Central district to Chai Wan. In May 1985, Newton presided over the opening ceremony of the line at Tai Koo, with a plaque unveiled by the Governor of Hong Kong Sir Edward Youde. Following this, a second harbour tunnel to carry increased numbers of passenger traffic opened in 1989.

Thanks to high ridership and property development including shopping malls and development built over railway depots (such as Telford Gardens), the MTR was being run without government subsidies. Newton also chaired the Hong Kong Futures Exchange from 1986 to 1989, as well as becoming a non-executive director of HongkongBank.

=== London and London Regional Transport ===
In December 1988, the British Secretary of State for Transport Paul Channon announced that Newton would join London Regional Transport, following the resignation of Sir Keith Bright. In March 1989, Newton became chairman and chief executive of London Regional Transport, and chairman of London Underground.

Newton's major project was the implementation of the Jubilee Line Extension – the first major extension to the Underground in 20 years. Experts from Hong Kong including MTR architect Roland Paoletti were recruited to progress the multibillion-pound project – which eventually opened in 1999.

Following the King's Cross fire in 1987, the state of neglect on the Tube and complacency of London Underground was criticised, with the Northern line nicknamed "the Misery line". Newton branded the Tube network "an appalling shambles" at a seminar on the future of London in 1991, noting that "The infrastructure has been neglected for 30 years". Newton subsequently planned a transformation of London Underground into a 'decently modern metro' over a period of 10 years, with upgrades to existing lines and strong service standards.

However the recession in the early 1990s cut ticket revenue, which was exacerbated by stop-go investment and Treasury budget cuts by around 30 per cent between 1993 and 1996 – making it difficult to progress the upgrade programme. Following the Autumn statement in 1992, Newton was said to have had "a rare public outburst of anger" following a broken promise by the Government to increase investment to more than £700m a year. By March 1993, Newton authorised managers to blame deteriorating services and cancellations on broken Government pledges. Newton himself appeared on television after the November 1993 Budget and criticised the funding of London Regional Transport.

In 1994, Newton was due to retire. However, his chosen replacement – the deputy chairman of London Transport, Alan Watkins, was vetoed by the Treasury in March 1994, due to Watkins involvement in campaigning for more investment in London Underground. Newton was therefore unable to step down as Chairman of London Transport until a more suitable candidate was agreed. Newton eventually stepped down in September 1994, replaced by Peter Ford.

== Honours ==
Owing to Newton's work in Hong Kong, he was appointed Commander of the Most Excellent Order of the British Empire in 1988, before being knighted in 1993. In 1993 he was elected an Honorary Fellow of the Royal Academy of Engineering.

== Death ==
Newton died on 28 November 2012, aged 83.

== See also ==
- List of heads of public transport authorities in London

Civic offices
| Preceded by Sir Norman Thompson | Chairman of Mass Transit Railway Corporation (MTRC); 1983–1989 | Succeeded by Hamish Mathers |
| Preceded by Sir Neil Shields | Chairman of London Regional Transport; 1989–1994 | Succeeded by Peter Ford |
