= Elizabeth Curnow =

Elizabeth Curnow may refer to:

- Betty Curnow (1911–2005), New Zealand artist
- Elizabeth Curnow (QC) (1935–2011), British barrister and judge
