= Peter Ford (transport administrator) =

Peter Ford CBE
- Born: 21 November 1938
- Occupation: Chairman of London Regional Transport: 1994–1998

Peter John Ford, CBE (born 21 November 1938) was Executive Chairman of P&O European Ferries and North Sea Ferries in the 1970 and 1980s, and Chairman of London Regional Transport from 1994 until 1998.

== History ==
=== Townsend Thoresen and P&O ===
Ford was Chairman of Townsend Thoresen at the time of the Herald of Free Enterprise disaster in 1987. Following the disaster, Ford was criticised for underestimating the number of people killed in the disaster.

=== London Transport ===
Ford was appointed as Chairman of London Regional Transport (LT) in September 1994, replacing Sir Wilfrid Newton. During Ford's tenure, the number of passengers on London Underground and London Buses continued to rise – however cuts by the Treasury of £375m and cost overruns of £500m on the Jubilee Line Extension project increased the maintenance backlog on the Underground and worsened LT's financial position.

In April 1998, amid furore over the potential imposition of Public private partnership (PPP) on London Underground, Ford was removed as Chairman of LT by then Deputy Prime Minister John Prescott due to his opposition to PPP. Following this, Ford was highly critical of the government’s plan during a select committee, stating that "It’s going to be very difficult to make it work, and I think there is a very big element of uncertainty about the whole thing". Ford was replaced as Chairman by Sir Malcolm Bates – one of the architects behind the PPP.

Ford received a golden handshake of £350,000 – the balance of his contract. He was made a Commander of the Order of the British Empire in June 1998.

== See also ==
- List of heads of public transport authorities in London

Civic offices
Preceded by Sir Wilfrid Newton	Chairman of London Regional Transport; 1994–1998	Succeeded by Sir Malcolm Bates
