= Ann Goddard =

British barrister and judge

Her Honour Ann Goddard
- Judge Goddard
- Born: 22 January 1936; London Borough of Lambeth
- Died: 23 March 2011 (aged 75); London Borough of Lambeth
- Education: Newnham College

Ann Felicity Goddard (22 January 1936 – 23 March 2011) was a British barrister and judge. For many years, she was the only woman judge at the Old Bailey criminal court in London.

== Life ==
Goddard was born in Lambeth in 1936. Her father was a policeman and in the last eleven years of his life Goddard and her mother cared for him after he had a stroke. Goddard went to Grey Coat Hospital school in Westminster, Goddard took law at the University of Birmingham. After Birmingham she took a diploma in comparative legal studies at Newnham College in Cambridge.

She was one of three women who were Called to the Bar at the same time: she, Ann Curnow and Jean Southworth were to have similar careers. After she was Called to the Bar in 1960, she joined the set of chambers where she was to remain for her whole career, eventually becoming head of chambers. She was a quiet but thorough lawyer and she gained a lot of work from the Metropolitan Police where her father had worked. She was not interested in women's groups, arguing that men did not have a matching men's group.

She was attacked in court in 2001 and needed two stitches after being assaulted by a murder defendant. As a result, the Old Bailey spent millions to ensure that judges were better protected. In another case, she was criticised for allowing an accused rapist to question his victim for twenty hours in court. The man asked many questions that were unnecessary and that caused the woman distress. She was however praised by one source as it was realised that the man had a right to defend himself and if the judge interfered then this would be potential grounds for an appeal. Goddard was said to have cried on a number of occasions.

Goddard was the Old Bailey judge in the Jubilee line corruption trial which was trying men for bribing officials to gain work on the underground's Jubilee Line Extension in London. The long running trial tested the patience of the jurors. Two jurors were discharged and another only stayed on because she was told that the trial would finish before her wedding - it didn't. Two of the defendants were ill, one jury member became pregnant and another was arrested for fraud. The trial ended when a juror "went on strike". The Director of Public Prosecutions decided that a fair trial was not possible and the accused men were acquitted. This was a blow to Goddard. It is thought that the £60 million trial may have been successful if Goddard had agreed to let the jury only attend in the mornings.

Goddard became a Queen's Counsel in 1982 and led her chambers from 1985. She gave up being head of chambers in 1993 so she could become a judge. She became a senior circuit judge at the Old Bailey; for many years she was the only woman in that role.

Goddard had to retire in 2008 and she devoted her time to travel, her cat and her three god daughters. She had bought the cat at the suggestion of her old friend Elizabeth Curnow. She died in Lambeth in 2011 from cancer.

== Legacy ==
Goddard left a bequest to Gray's Inn which funds scholarships for lawyers training in publicly funded work.
