= Tai Koo station =

MTR station on Hong Kong Island

Tai Koo 太古
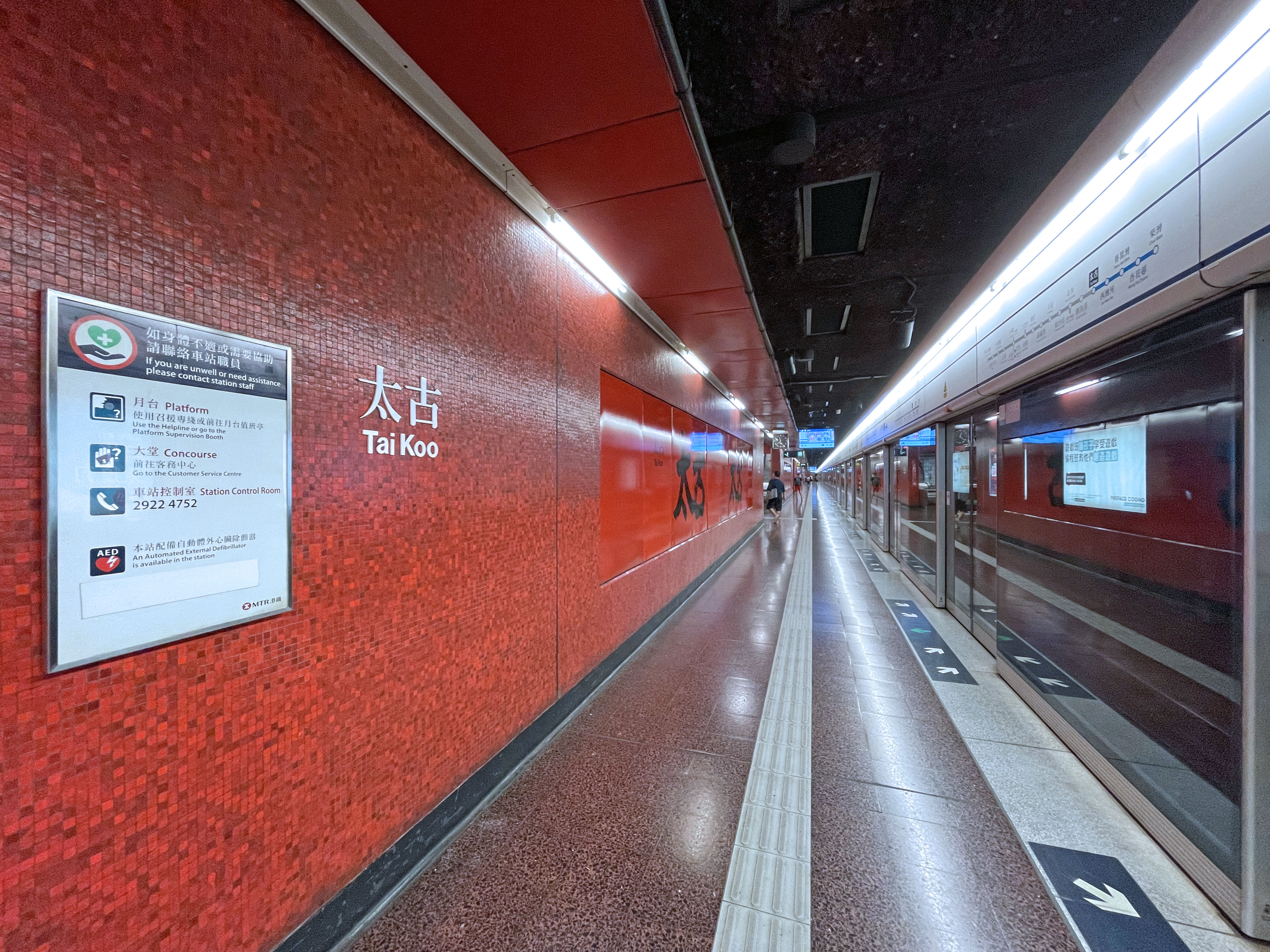
- Platform 1

Chinese name
- Traditional Chinese: 太古
- Simplified Chinese: 太古
- Hanyu Pinyin: Tàigǔ
- Cantonese Yale: Taaigú
- Literal meaning: Most historic
Transcriptions
Standard Mandarin
- Hanyu Pinyin: Tàigǔ
Yue: Cantonese
- Yale Romanization: Taaigú
- Jyutping: Taai3Ku2

General information
- Location: Kornhill, King's Road, Quarry Bay; Eastern District, Hong Kong
- Coordinates: 22°17′05″N 114°12′58″E
- System: MTR rapid transit station
- Owner: MTR Corporation
- Operator: MTR Corporation
- Line: Island line
- Platforms: 2 (1 island platform)
- Tracks: 2
- Connections: Tram; Bus, minibus

Construction
- Structure type: Underground
- Platform levels: 1
- Accessible: Yes

Other information
- Station code: TAK

History
- Opened: 31 May 1985; 41 years ago
- Former names: Kornhill

Services
| Preceding station | MTR | Following station |
|---|---|---|
| Quarry Bay towards Kennedy Town | Island line | Sai Wan Ho towards Chai Wan |
Track layout
Location
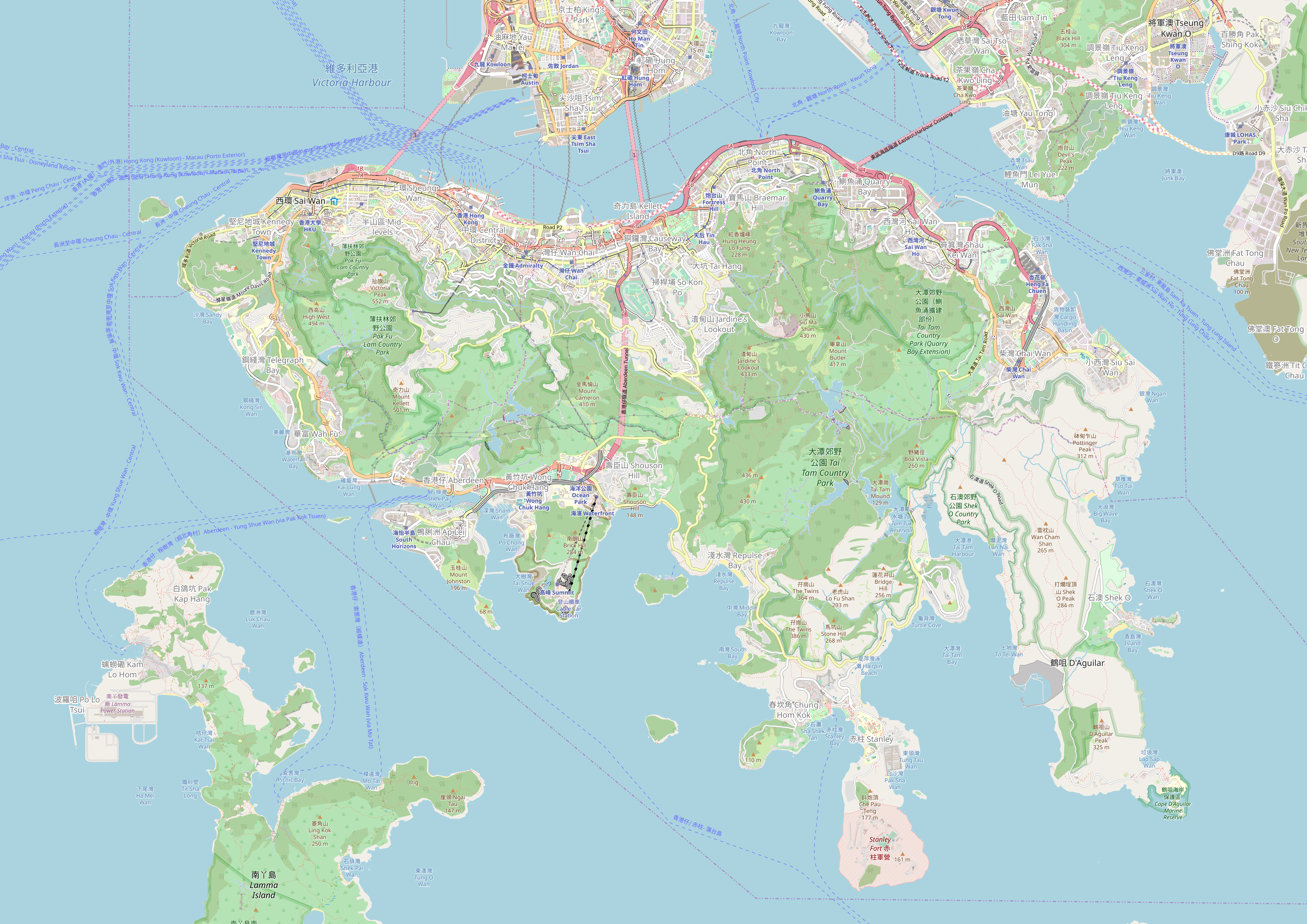
- Location within MTR Location within Hong Kong Island

Tai Koo (Chinese: 太古; Cantonese Yale: Taaigú; pinyin: Tàigǔ) is a station on the Island line of the Hong Kong MTR system. The station is located in Kornhill, Quarry Bay on Hong Kong Island and serves the area including Kornhill, Kornhill Gardens and Taikoo Shing. Tai Koo has a unique crimson livery.

The station was named for Taikoo Shing, the large-scale residential development built on the former site of Taikoo Dockyard, a Swire company, "Taikoo" being the Romanisation of the latter's Chinese name.

== History ==
Dragages et Travaux Publics (later Dragages Hong Kong) was awarded as the contractor of the station and construction began in 1982. The works comprised twin tunnels and a station built in a 24-metre span rock cavern.

Excavation of the station cavern was completed in October 1983.

The Island line opening ceremony was held in this station in May 1985 and was officiated by then-MTR chairman Sir Wilfrid Newton and Governor of Hong Kong Edward Youde, who unveiled the commemorative plaques at the concourse level. The station is built in what was, at the time of its construction, the largest man-made cavern in Asia.

== Station layout ==
Tai Koo adheres to the general layout of most MTR stations. At ground level, there are numerous alphanumerically-named entrances and exits.

Platforms 1 and 2 are arranged in the simple island platform layout. Unlike most of the other underground stations on the Island line, Tai Koo does not have separate tubes for each track and platform, but is located in a single tube encompassing both the concourse and the platform. Although it was not built in the cut and cover method, it is similar to cut and cover stations in that although there are escalators and stairs in the middle of the platform, it has an open design and the platforms are not separated. Each platform is equipped with platform screen doors for safety and ventilation.

| G | Ground level | Exits |
| L1 | Subway | Passageway connecting Exit D exits |
| L2 | Concourse | MTRShops |
| L2 | Concourse | vending machines, ATM |
| L2 | Concourse | Octopus promotion machine |
| L3; Platform | Platform 1 | Island line towards Chai Wan (Sai Wan Ho) → |
| L3; Platform | Island platform, doors will open on the right |
| L3; Platform | Platform 2 | ← Island Line towards Kennedy Town (Quarry Bay) |

== Entrances/exits ==
There are five groups of entrances and exits at Tai Koo station labeled A to E. In certain circumstances, there are subsets of these exit groups; these are marked with numbers.

- A: at the northeast corner of King's Road and Kornhill Road
  - A1: for Kornhill Gardens blocks 1-4
  - A2: for Kornhill Plaza North
- B: opposite the intersection of King's Road and Kornhill Road, for Kornhill blocks N-R
- C: between Kornhill Road and Hong On Street, for Kornhill blocks A-M and Kornhill Plaza South
- D: between King's Road and Taikoo Shing Road
  - D1: for Cityplaza, One Island East and East Hong Kong
  - D2: for Cityplaza Ground Floor
- E: at northeastern corner of Kornhill Gardens at King's Road
  - E1: for Cityplaza Second Floor
  - E2: for Kornhill Gardens blocks 5-6
  - E3: for Kornhill Gardens blocks 7-10

== Gallery ==
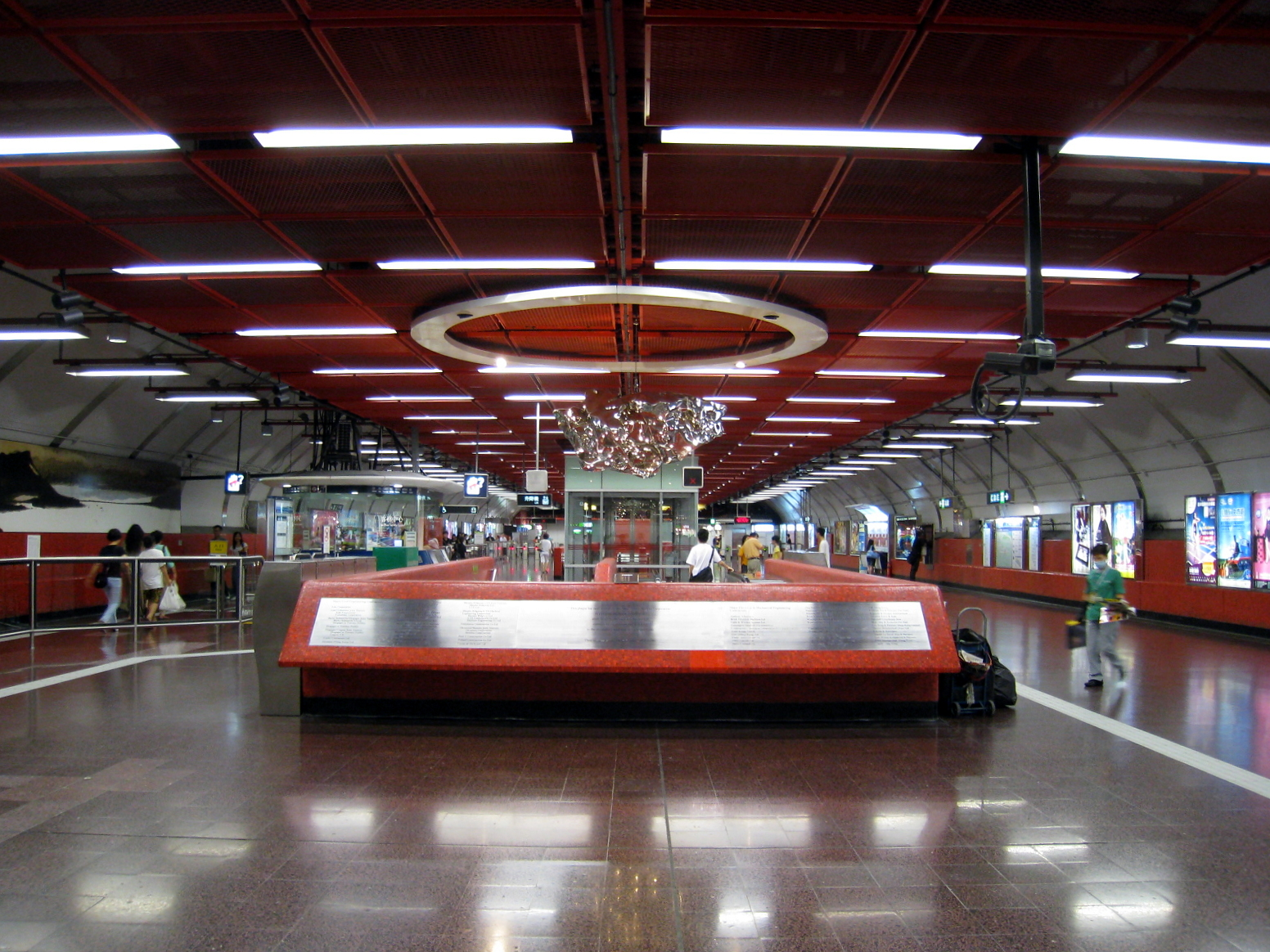
Concourse

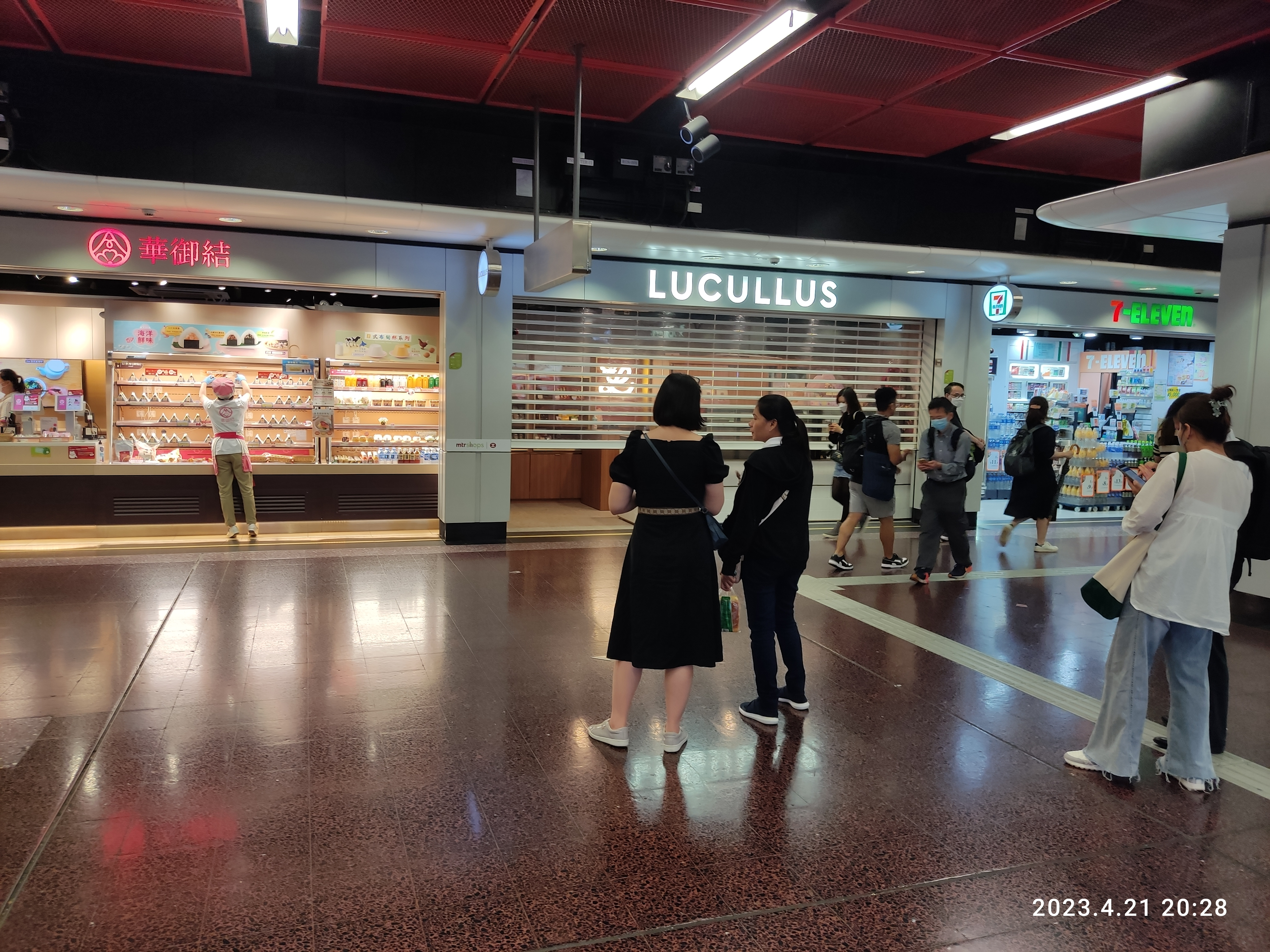
Shops

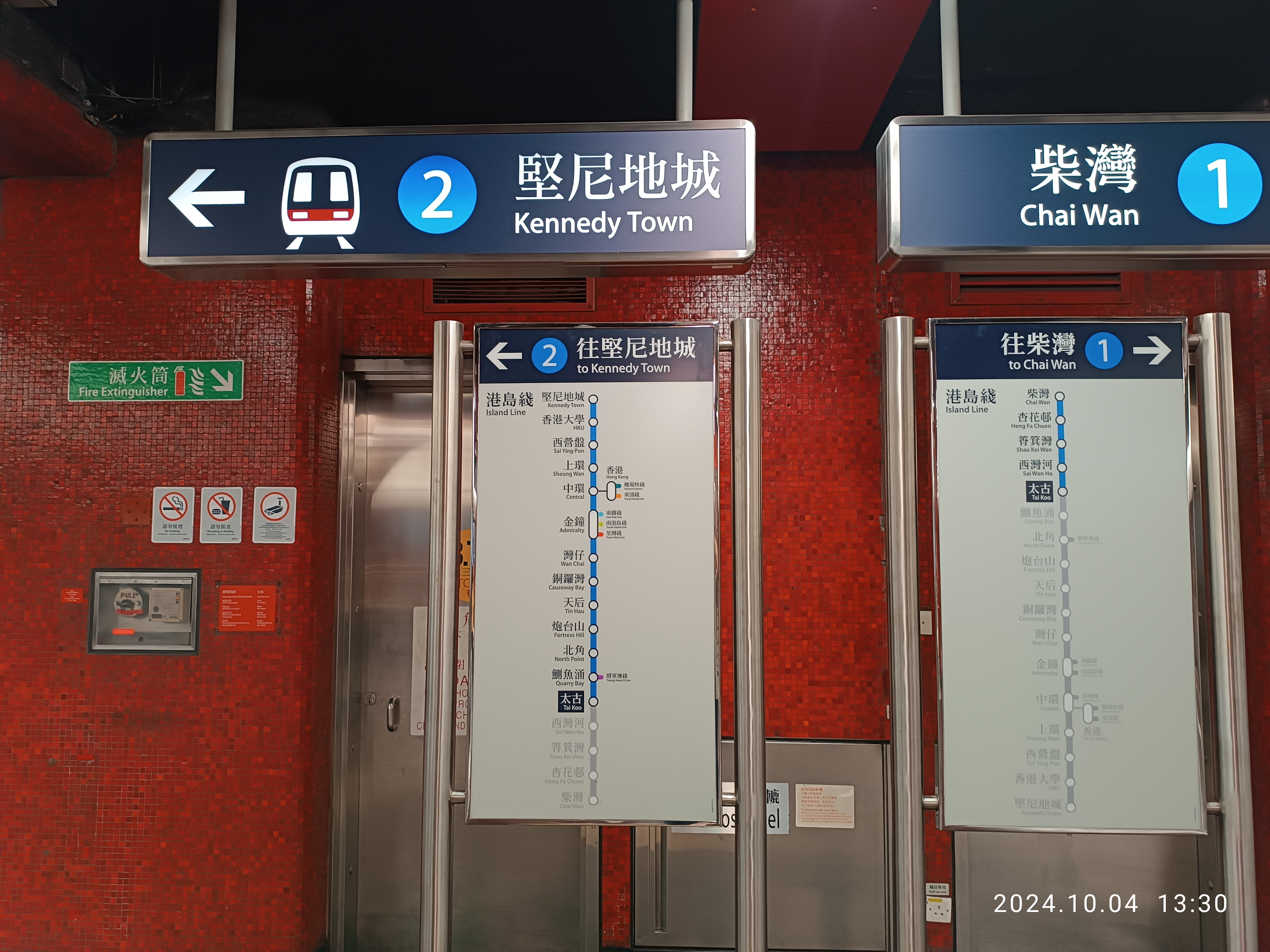
Direction Maps
