= Waterloo tube station =

London Underground station

Waterloo
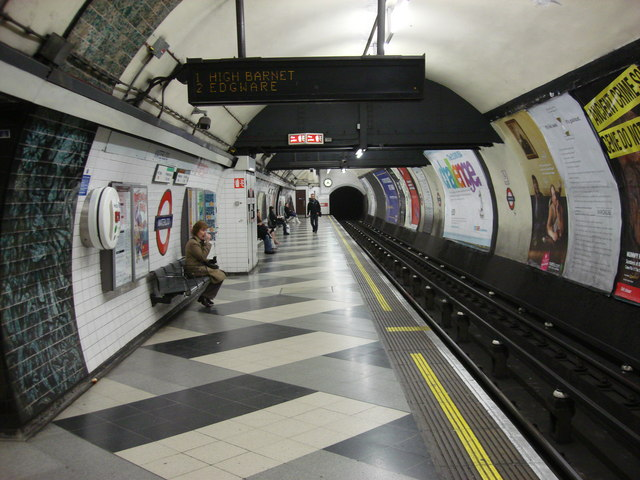
- Northern line northbound platform at the station
- Interactive map of Waterloo

General information
- Location: Waterloo
- Local authority: London Borough of Lambeth
- Managed by: London Underground
- Owner: London Underground
- Number of platforms: 8
- Accessible: Yes (Jubilee line and southbound Bakerloo line only)
- Fare zone: 1
- OSI: Waterloo; Waterloo East

London Underground annual entry and exit
- 2021: ▲29.87 million
- 2022: ▲68.72 million
- 2023: ▲70.33 million
- 2024: ▲74.14 million
- 2025: ▲70.79 million

Railway companies
- Original company: Waterloo & City Railway

Key dates
- 8 August 1898: W&CR opened station
- 10 March 1906: BS&WR started
- 13 September 1926: CCH&R started
- 20 November 1999: Jubilee line started

Other information
- External links: TfL station info page
- Coordinates: 51.5025°N 0.1130°W

Waterloo (/ˌwɔːtərˈluː/) is a London Underground station in Waterloo, Central London. It is located beneath Waterloo National Rail station. As of 2024, Waterloo is the most used station on the London Underground, with 77.39 million users. It is served by four lines: Bakerloo, Jubilee, Northern and Waterloo & City.

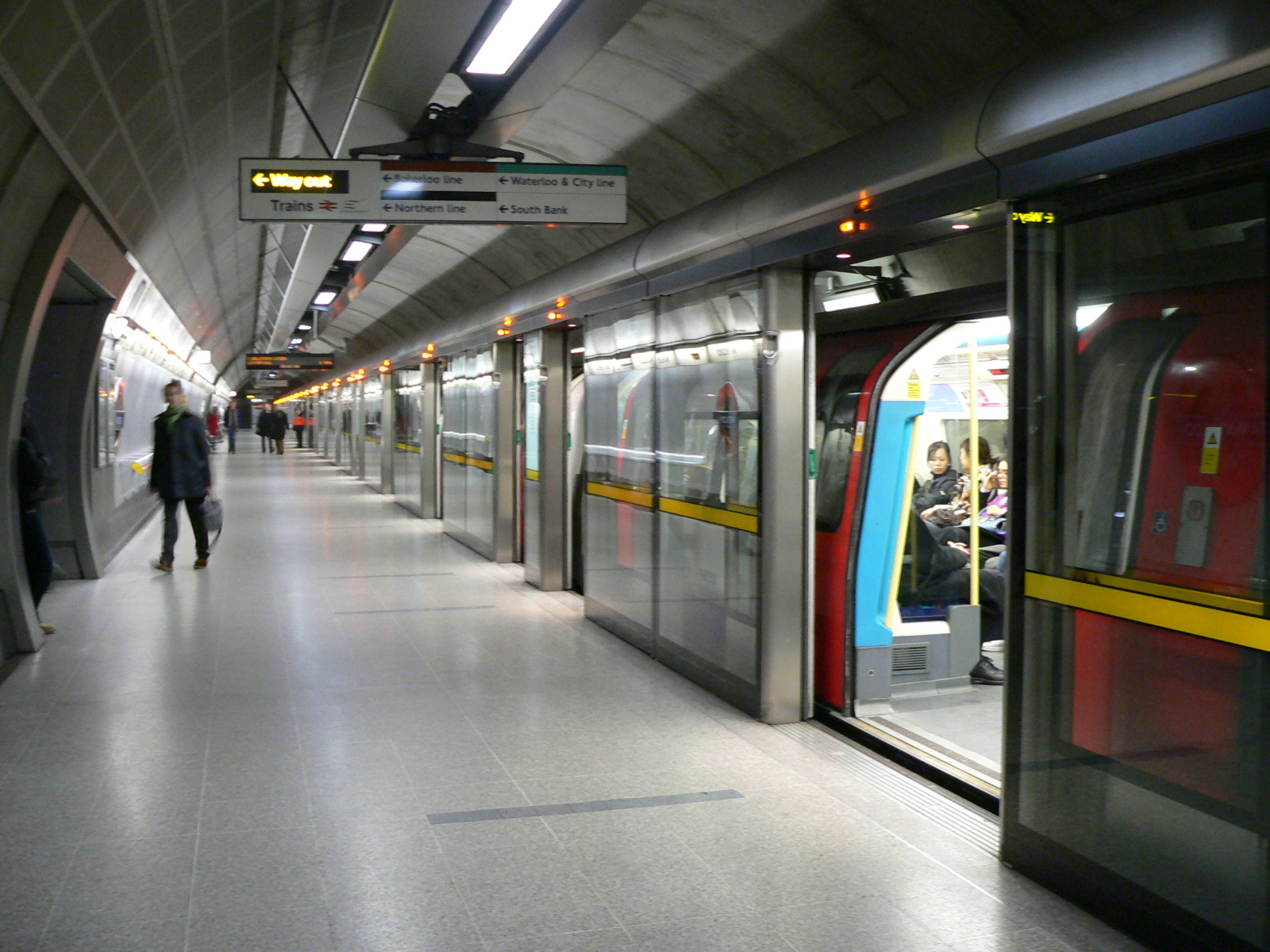
The Jubilee line westbound platform

The station is situated in London fare zone 1 and is located near the South Bank of the River Thames, in the London Borough of Lambeth. It is within walking distance of the London Eye.

== History ==
The first Underground Line at Waterloo was opened on 8 August 1898 by the Waterloo & City Railway (W&CR), a subsidiary of the owners of the main line station, the London and South Western Railway (L&SWR). The W&CR, nicknamed "The Drain", achieved in a limited way the L&SWR's original plan of taking its tracks the short distance north-east into the City of London.

On 10 March 1906, the Baker Street & Waterloo Railway (now the Bakerloo line) was opened. On 13 September 1926, the extension of the Hampstead & Highgate line (as the Charing Cross branch of the Northern line was then known) was opened from Embankment to the existing City and South London Railway station at Kennington with a new station at Waterloo.

As a subsidiary of the L&SWR and its successor, the Southern Railway, the W&CR was not a part of the London Underground system. Following nationalisation of the main line railway companies in 1948, it became part of British Railways (later British Rail).

In 1951, the Leslie Green designed York Road entrance of the Underground station was demolished and replaced by a new temporary entrance on the other side of the road, part of the Festival of Britain site. As part of this work, the escalators were built this new entrance, replacing lifts. This entrance also served the Waterloo Air Terminal. In the early 1960s, a permanent entrance building was built, integrated into the Shell Centre complex.

In March 1965, a British Rail and London Transport joint planning committee published "A Railway Plan for London" that included a recommendation to revive a plan from the 1900s for an extension of the Piccadilly line's Aldwych branch to Waterloo. London Transport had already sought parliamentary approval to construct tunnels from Aldwych to Waterloo in November 1964, and in August 1965, parliamentary powers were granted. Detailed planning took place, although public spending cuts led to postponement of the scheme in 1967 before tenders were invited.

=== 1990s refurbishment ===
The Underground station was comprehensively refurbished in the early 1990s as part of the construction of Waterloo International station for international Eurostar services, with the Main Ticket hall underneath the railway concourse expanded and connected to the new International station. The platforms were also decorated with artwork by Christopher Tipping on the theme of the nearby National Theatre, although these murals have since been removed.

The Waterloo & City line was closed for 2 months in 1993 to be upgraded with new trains and the four rail electrical system of the London Underground. The ownership of the line was transferred from Network SouthEast to the Underground on 1 April 1994 as part of the privatisation of British Rail. Due to an Easter shut-down, the first Underground service on the line was on 5 April 1994.

=== Jubilee Line extension ===
The Jubilee Line Extension was constructed in the 1990s to extend the Jubilee line from Green Park to Stratford, via the then new Canary Wharf development. Opening in September 1999, the new Jubilee line station was designed by in-house JLE Project Architects, overseen by Roland Paoletti.

The design of the station was complex, due to the distance between the existing Bakerloo and Northern lines and the extension - as well as the railway station located above. To connect the station together, a 115-metre (377 ft) moving walkway link was installed, one of only two on the Underground; the other gives access to the Waterloo & City line platform at Bank station. The colonnade on Waterloo Road underneath the taxi cab road of the station - originally used for goods deliveries and a bus stand - was also repurposed as the new Jubilee line ticket hall.

The station was temporarily the western terminus of the extension running from Stratford in east London, before the final section to link the extension to the original line was opened between Waterloo and Green Park on 20 November 1999.

There is a westwards-facing crossover to the west of the Jubilee line platforms to enable trains from Stanmore to terminate and turn around head back west.

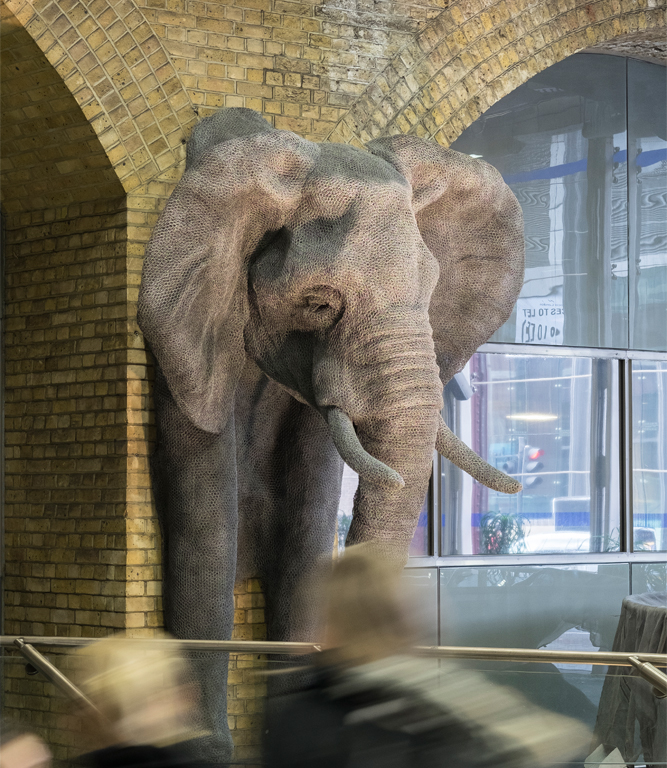
Elephant by Kendra Haste, located in the Jubilee Line Ticket Hall

A sculpture of an Elephant by artist Kendra Haste is located between the escalators in the Colonnade Ticket Hall. The sculpture was purchased by London Underground, having been originally commissioned in 2000 as part of its Platform for Art programme and set up at Gloucester Road tube station.

=== Southbank Place ===
As part of the redevelopment of the Shell Centre into "Southbank Place" by Canary Wharf Group and Qatari Diar, the existing York Road entrance was closed in 2015 to be completely rebuilt. The new, larger York Road entrance, which also included an additional escalator - reopened in May 2019.

== Ticket halls ==
The station has 3 ticket halls and 5 main entrances. Additional entrances to the Underground station are available in peak hours via a subway underneath the railway station from station platforms.

- Main Ticket Hall, located underneath the railway concourse.
- Colonnade/Jubilee Line Ticket Hall, located at street level on Waterloo Road, underneath the cab road of the railway station. This ticket hall opened in 1999 as part of the Jubilee Line Extension.
- York Road Ticket Hall, located at street level on York Road in the Southbank Place development, to the west of the railway station.

The three ticket halls are connected via escalators, passageways and the moving walkway to the four sets of platforms.

== Elizabeth House ==
Elizabeth House, located directly adjacent to the mainline railway station, is being redeveloped by HB Reavis. As part of this redevelopment, a lift shaft will be constructed to provide step free access to the Northern line.

== Connections ==
The station is served by London Buses, with daytime, express and night routes.

== See also ==
- Waterloo Underground Depot

Preceding station	London Underground	Following station
Embankment towards Harrow & Wealdstone	Bakerloo line	Lambeth North towards Elephant & Castle
Westminster towards Stanmore	Jubilee line	Southwark towards Stratford
Embankment towards Edgware, Mill Hill East or High Barnet	Northern line Charing Cross branch	Kennington towards Battersea Power Station, Morden or Kennington
Terminus	Waterloo & City line Mondays to Fridays only	Bank Terminus
Abandoned Plans
Aldwych towards Holborn	Piccadilly line Proposed extension from Aldwych (never constructed)	Terminus
