= Jubilee line corruption trial =

Jubilee Line Corruption Trial
- Court: Central Criminal Court
- Full case name: R v Rayment and others (Stephen Rayment, Mark Woodward-Smith, Paul Maw, Paul Fisher, Mark Skinner, Graham Scard and Anthony Wootton)
- Started: 25 June 2003
- Decided: 22 March 2005
- Citation: HM Crown Prosecution Service Inspectorate Report June 2006

Court membership
- Judge sitting: Judge Ann Goddard QC

Case opinions
- The Jubilee Line case, which had been ongoing since 2003, was terminated in 2005 after the prosecution chose not to oppose the discharge of the jury, leading to public concern and media attention; subsequently, the Attorney General initiated a review to examine the case's circumstances and suggest measures to prevent similar outcomes.

Keywords
- Attorney General for England and Wales; Bribery; Corruption; Fraud; Jubilee Line Extension; Transport for London

The Jubilee line corruption trial (R v Rayment and others; defendants were S. Rayment, M. Woodward-Smith, P. Maw, P. Fisher, M. Skinner, G. Scard and A. Wootton) was a trial at the Old Bailey in London, England.

It began on 25 June 2003, lasted 21 months, and collapsed on 22 March 2005 upon the prosecution announcing its decision not to oppose a defence application to discharge the jury.

== Dispute ==
The trial centered around accusations that companies had manipulated the bidding process, exchanged confidential information, and engaged in corrupt practices to win contracts for various aspects of the Jubilee Line Extension from London Underground Limited (LUL) in the 1990s.

The two primary defendants managed a quantity surveying firm called RWS. The prosecution alleged that they had influenced specific LUL personnel to access confidential financial data from LUL. This information was purportedly used fraudulently for a client contractor during the initial tendering process on contracts worth tens of millions of pounds and later for multiple client contractors making claims against LUL for contractual changes. One defendant admitted partial guilt for fraudulent actions during the tendering process, while all other defendants denied involvement.

== Outcomes ==
The trial sparked concerns about the readiness of juries, which are selected randomly from the working-age population, to participate in lengthy, full-day trials.

The trial faced several issues, such as two jurors being discharged for personal reasons. Another juror had been assured she could get married and go on a honeymoon in June 2005, but it turned out the trial would still be ongoing at that time. Additionally, two of the defendants became sick during the lengthy trial.

The total expense for the police investigation, legal proceedings, and the entire trial, which also included expenses for the jurors and legal aid, amounted to approximately £60 million. When the trial fell apart, it led to an examination of the "investigation and legal procedures" by the Chief Inspector of the Crown Prosecution Service. The results of this review were published in June 2006.

It has been described as one of the longest jury trials to have occurred in the UK, although a subsequent case in Scotland in 2017 sat for longer.

The "striking" juror who ultimately brought about the collapse remarked that the trial caused him loss of earnings that threatened his ability to pay Oxford University fees for a course set to start in October 2005. The juror set to marry lost both her wedding date and her job.

== See also ==
- Jubilee Line Extension
- Juries in England and Wales
