= Transported by Design =

Transported by Design was a programme of activities which aimed to raise awareness of the importance of both physical and service design in London's transport network. The 18-month long campaign showcased how design has helped shape London's transport system as known today.

In October 2015, after two months of public voting, 10 favourite transport design icons were chosen by Londoners. The winners, selected from among 100 options, were:

- Black cab
- work of Frank Pick
- Harry Beck's original tube map
- Baker Street tube station platforms
- London Underground roundel
- AEC Routemaster bus
- Mark Wallinger's Labyrinth
- RT type bus
- S-Stock trains
- Westminster tube station

The programme showcased transport design through exhibitions, walks, the launch of a new uniform for London Underground in November 2015 and an event at Regent Street in July 2016 The programme was sponsored by Exterion Media.
