= Jubilee Line Extension =

London Underground extension

Coordinates: 51.509°N 0.141°W

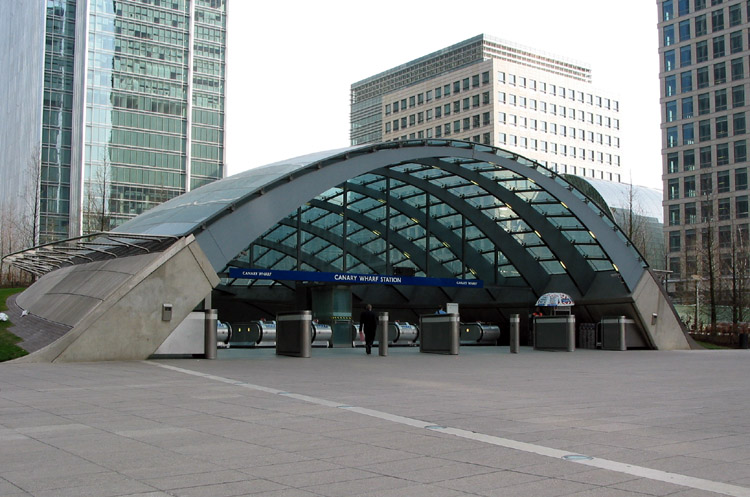
Entrance to Canary Wharf tube station, built as part of the Jubilee line Extension

The Jubilee Line Extension (JLE) is the extension of the London Underground's Jubilee line from Green Park to Stratford through south and east London. An eastward extension of the line was first proposed in the 1970s. As part of the development of London Docklands, the line was extended to serve Canary Wharf and other areas of south and east London. Construction began in 1993, and it opened in stages from May to December 1999, at a cost of £3.5 billion.

The 11 new stations on the line were designed to be "future-proof", with wide passageways, large quantities of escalators and lifts, and emergency exits. The stations were the first on the Underground to have platform edge doors, and were built to have step free access throughout. Each of the stations was designed by a different architect, and the overall design of the project was led by Roland Paoletti. The stations have subsequently been praised as exemplary pieces of 20th-century architecture. The project was the single largest addition to the Underground in 25 years.

== Stations ==
The extension of the line diverges just east of Green Park, eastward to:

Station	London borough	Infrastructure	Architects
Westminster	Westminster	new ticket hall and two additional deep-level platforms	Hopkins Architects
Waterloo	Lambeth	new ticket hall and two additional deep-level platforms	JLE Project Architects
Southwark	Southwark	new station with two deep-level platforms	MacCormac, Jamieson, Prichard
London Bridge	Southwark	new ticket hall and two additional deep-level platforms	Weston Williamson and JLE Project Architects
Bermondsey	Southwark	new station with two deep-level platforms	Ian Ritchie
Canada Water	Southwark	new station with two deep-level platforms and two new sub-surface platforms on East London Line	JLE Project Architects and Heron Associates
Canada Water	Southwark	new bus station	Eva Jiřičná
Canary Wharf	Tower Hamlets	new station with two deep-level platforms	Foster + Partners
North Greenwich	Greenwich	new station with three deep-level platforms	Alsop, Lyall and Störmer
North Greenwich	Greenwich	new bus station	Foster + Partners
Canning Town	Newham	new station with two surface platforms, two new elevated platforms for the DLR and two surface platforms for the North London line, new bus station	Troughton McAslan
West Ham	Newham	new station building with two additional surface platforms	Van Heyningen and Haward Architects
Stratford	Newham	new station building and plaza	WilkinsonEyre
Stratford	Newham	three additional surface platforms and train crew building	Troughton McAslan

Before the extension, the Jubilee line terminated at Charing Cross. The section between Charing Cross and Green Park, which diverges to the northwest, is now unused for passenger services but is maintained for emergency use. The abandoned platforms are occasionally rented out by TfL as a film set e.g. Skyfall, Thor: The Dark World and Woman in Black II.

== Planning ==
=== Original 1970s plans ===
The Jubilee line between Baker Street and Charing Cross was intended to be the first phase of the Fleet Line (as the Jubilee line was originally called). In the first version of the Fleet Line Extension plan, the line ran from Charing Cross via Aldwych and Ludgate Circus to Fenchurch Street station, then under the River Thames to connect to the East London line north of Surrey Docks (now Surrey Quays) from where it would take over Underground services to New Cross Gate and New Cross with tunnels continuing from the latter to Lewisham. (Note: Stations were to be provided at Aldwych, Ludgate Circus, Cannon Street, Fenchurch Street, Surrey Docks, New Cross, New Cross Gate and Lewisham.) In anticipation of this, the tunnels of the first phase of the line continued eastward from Charing Cross under Strand almost as far as Aldwych.

This plan was modified shortly before the Jubilee line opened in 1979. Under the new plan (known for planning purposes as the River Line), it would run to Fenchurch Street as before and continue via the Isle of Dogs, Royal Docks and Woolwich Arsenal to the "new town" at Thamesmead. A branch from Silvertown to Beckton would have provided a link to a new depot. (Note: Parliamentary approval was granted for stations at St Katharine Docks, Wapping, Surrey Docks North, Millwall, North Greenwich, Custom House, Silvertown, Woolwich Arsenal and Beckton. Further stations at Thamesmead West and Thamesmead Central were planned if the line was continued beyond Woolwich.) This route is not dissimilar to the Crossrail route through the Docklands.

=== Jubilee Line Extension ===
Plans to extend the line were revived in the late 1980s, prompted by the proposed development of London Docklands and Canary Wharf, which substantially increased the predicted numbers of jobs in the Isle of Dogs and required a transport network with much greater capacity than provided by the Docklands Light Railway (DLR). Initially, Olympia and York, the developers of Canary Wharf, proposed building a dedicated 'Waterloo and Greenwich Railway' from Waterloo through London Bridge to Canary Wharf and then to Westcombe Park in Greenwich, costing £400 million. However, London Transport resisted this, preferring to wait for the results of studies into new railway construction. One of these, the East London Railway Study, recommended an extension of the Jubilee line from Green Park to Westminster, then following the route of the Waterloo and Greenwich Railway, continuing to Stratford via Canning Town alongside the North London Line. This option was adopted, with an estimated cost of £2.1 billion to which Olympia and York would make a £400 million contribution, the original cost estimate of the Waterloo and Greenwich Railway. In the end it cost £3.5bn, partly because of huge cost overruns during construction. Where initially the developers were to pay for a large part of the extension, their final contribution was less than 5%.

The extension was authorised in 1990. A station was originally planned at Blackwall, but this was replaced by diverting the line between Canary Wharf and Stratford underneath the Thames to serve the Greenwich peninsula at North Greenwich station. Plans for the Millennium Dome did not yet exist, and this diversion was made to provide for a planned housing development on the site of disused gasworks. British Gas plc contributed £25 million to the scheme. The stations at Southwark and Bermondsey were not initially certain.

The project also required the construction of a new depot to serve the extended line, given the increased number of trains could not be accommodated at the existing Neasden Depot – hence a site at Stratford Market was chosen. 59 1996 Stock trains were ordered as part of the extension, following cancellation of the plan to heavily refurbish the original 1983 stock trains.

Main works were authorised by the London Underground Act 1992, with additional works allowed by the London Underground (Jubilee) Act 1993. In May 1992, Olympia and York (the developers of Canary Wharf) went into administration following the early 1990s recession. This caused a delay to the project, as the Treasury did not wish to proceed without private sector investment. In September 1993, the financial restricting of Canary Wharf was completed, and it was agreed that the £400 million contribution would be maintained. In October 1993, Secretary of State for Transport John MacGregor gave the go ahead for the project. Contracts to build the project were awarded soon after, at a cost of around £1.2 billion.

== Construction ==
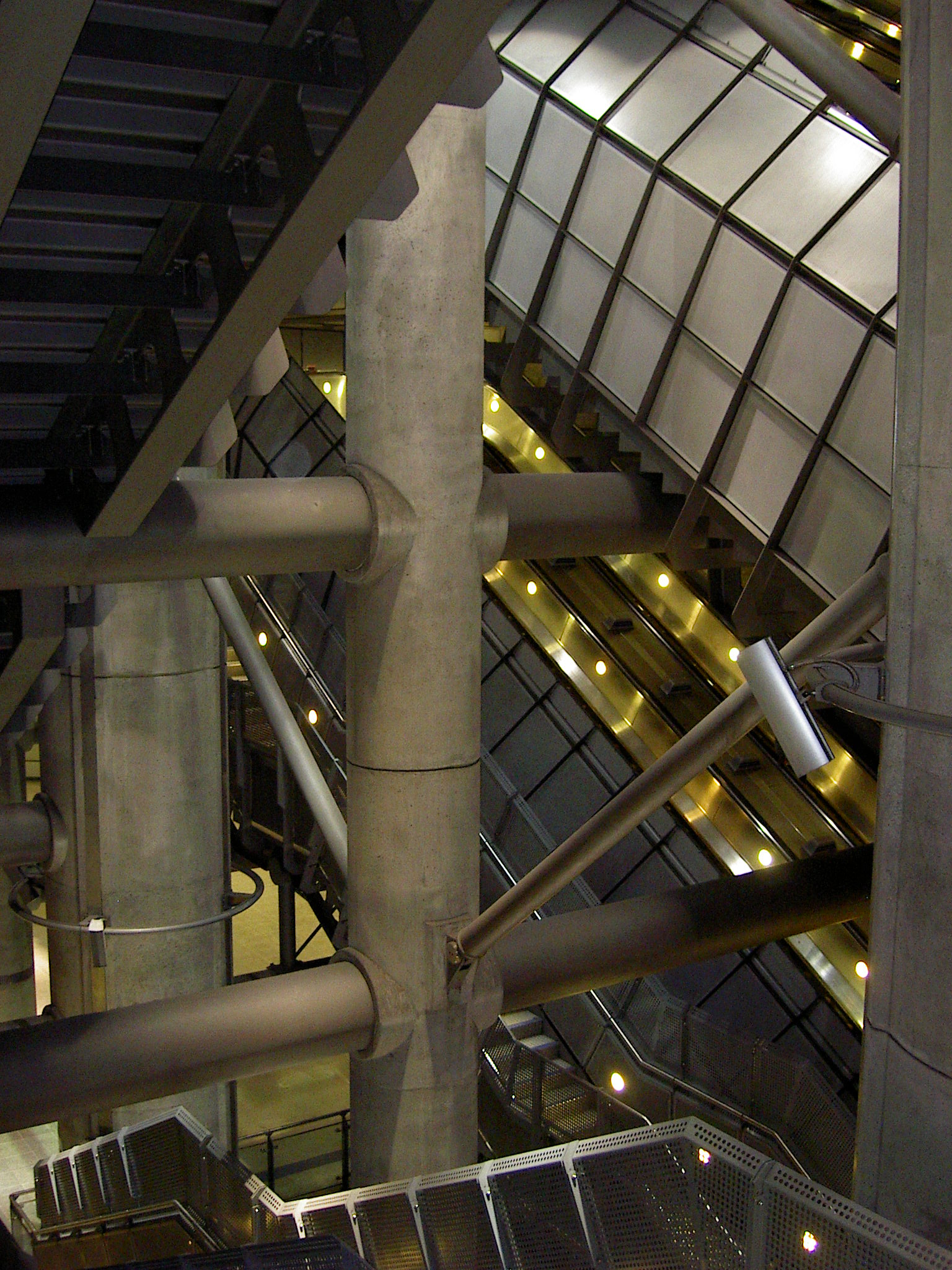
Structural columns at Westminster

Construction of the project officially began on 8 December 1993, with a ceremony at Canary Wharf attended by Prime Minister John Major. Construction was expected to take 53 months, with an opening date of May 1998. Tunnelling began in August 1994 at North Greenwich. By August 1996, all tunnelling work had been completed.

Tunnelling had been delayed after a collapse during the Heathrow Express project in October 1994, which used the same New Austrian Tunnelling method. Indeed, construction under Westminster had caused the Elizabeth Tower to tilt slightly. Other delays subsequently affected the project, including wildcat strikes by electricians and changes to the designs of the stations. The extension was supposed to have moving block signalling, designed by Westinghouse, in order to reach 36 trains per hour at peak times. As design of this overran, this was postponed in favour of more traditional signalling. Twelve years later these features were completed, allowing for up to 33 trains per hour. By November 1997, a September 1998 date was planned.

The new Stratford Market Depot was completed in March 1998 – allowing for testing and commissioning of the new 1996 Stock trains, as well as the testing of the new extension itself. By June 1998, opening was planned in Spring 1999. By November 1998, a phased opening throughout 1999 was being considered. By February 1999, the cost of the extension had increased to a total of £3.3 billion.

=== Opening ===
The first phase of the extension from Stratford to North Greenwich was opened by the Deputy Prime Minister John Prescott on 14 May 1999. There was concern that the entire line would not be open in time for the Millennium Dome, which would open on 1 January 2000. The second phase between North Greenwich and Bermondsey opened on 24 September 1999. The extension was linked to the rest of the Jubilee line with the opening of the final phase on 20 November 1999. Westminster – complicated by the interface with the subsurface platforms, which remained in operation during construction – opened on 22 December 1999, shortly before the Millennium Dome deadline. The final construction cost of the extension was £3.5 billion.

In March 2005, a criminal trial regarding corruption and insider information during the construction of the extension collapsed, after 21 months and a cost of £60m.

== Design ==
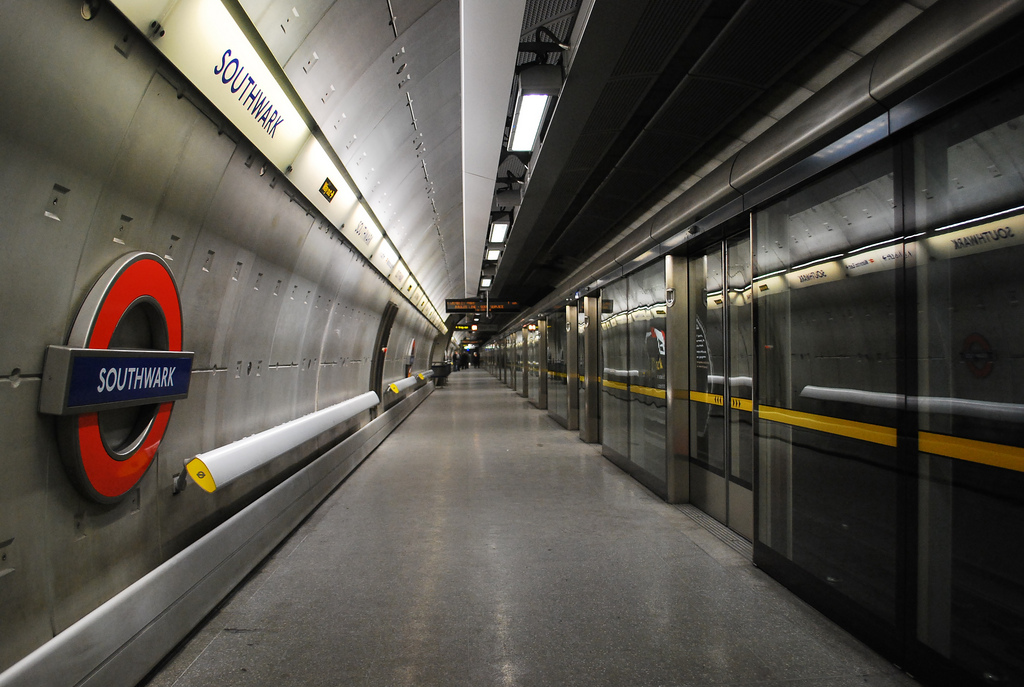
Platforms at Southwark, showing platform edge doors

The design of the extension is radically different from anything else on the London Underground. Stations are characterised by cavernous, stark interiors lined with polished metal panels and moulded concrete walls and columns. Canary Wharf has been compared to a cathedral, with it being said that the neighbouring One Canada Square, if laid on its side, could fit in the station with room to spare. Westminster has a dramatic vertical void nearly 40 m (130 ft) deep.

The size of the stations was a response to safety concerns—overcrowding and a lack of exits had been significant factors in the 1987 King's Cross disaster—and an attempt to "future-proof" stations by designing from the start for a high use. Most platforms and halls are full only in a busy rush hour, all provide step-free access, platforms have emergency exits at both ends, ventilation, as well as fireproof lifts. To ensure passenger flow, a large quantity of escalators (at least three per station) were installed, totalling 115 over the entire extension, increasing the total number of escalators over the entire Underground network by almost half.

The extension was also built with a wider tunnel diameter of 4.35 m allowing a passenger walkway used for emergency purposes; unfortunately wider trains are not possible due to the narrower tunnel dimension northwards of Green Park.

A number of leading architects were employed to design the stations, overseen by Roland Paoletti and a small team of in-house JLE Architects. It was decided from the outset that although each station would be designed as an individual entity, they would be linked by a common design philosophy and functional elements. Spaciousness was the most noticeable, along with the shared theme of grey and silver polished metal and concrete interiors. More subtly, many stations were designed to admit as much natural light as possible. At Bermondsey and to a lesser extent at Canada Water and Southwark, rotundas and shafts allow daylight to reach, or nearly reach, the platforms.

The platforms saw another innovation: full-height platform edge doors to improve airflow, prevent people from jumping or falling onto the track, prevent litter depositing upon the track and stop dirt circulating around the network, amongst other features. These are the first platform edge doors to be installed on a commercial railway in Great Britain.

=== Reception ===
Upon opening, the Jubilee Line Extension was widely welcomed, with praise for the architecture, accessibility and expansion of the Tube to south-east and east London. Terence Conran stated that "the creative partnership of architecture and engineering is striking", with The Times stating that "for all the teething problems, [the] outcome has measured up to the highest expectations." The Royal Fine Art Commission named the extension as a whole their Millennium Building of the Year, with the chair of the judging panel calling it "comparable to the achievement of Haussmann when he constructed the great boulevards of Paris". For his work on the project, Roland Paoletti received the RIBA/Arts Council Award for "Client of the Year" 1999 and was appointed a Commander of the Order of the British Empire (CBE) in the 2000 New Year Honours for "services to Architecture". The Architectural Review called him "the Medici of London Transport".

Many of the new stations subsequently received individual awards and commendations for their architecture, including Westminster and Canary Wharf being jointly awarded the 2000 Civic Trust Building of the Year.

== Legacy ==
Since the opening of the extension in 1999, areas along the line such as Canary Wharf, the Greenwich Peninsula and Stratford have seen substantial commercial and residential development. Canary Wharf has become London's second financial district, rivalling the City of London. Research by KPMG and Savills for Transport for London (TfL) indicated that the extension led to increases in land value along the line of around 50%. During October 2004, TfL published a report showing "substantial benefits" as a result of the extension, including development of the Canary Wharf financial district, reduced travel time for residents along the line and improved modal share. As part of the development of the Crossrail project, TfL estimated that agglomeration benefits as a result of the JLE led to a benefit–cost ratio of around 3, an increase from 1.56 calculated in 1989.

The extension has proved extremely successful in relieving congestion on the DLR and in opening up access to parts of east London with formerly poor transport links. As such it allowed access to all other London Underground stations with only a single change.

The Jubilee line was considered an essential part of the public transport network for the London 2012 Olympic and Paralympic Games, allowing access to major venues in Stratford and the Royal Docks. As of 2019, ridership on the line has increased substantially since the extension opened, becoming the 3rd busiest Underground line, with the Jubilee line having four of the 10 busiest stations.

The stations themselves have subsequently been praised as exemplary pieces of 20th century architecture, with Canary Wharf was voted as the "most loved" tube station in London in 2013, and Westminster was selected by Londoners as one of 10 favourite transport design icons in 2015.
