= Westminster tube station =

London Underground station

Westminster
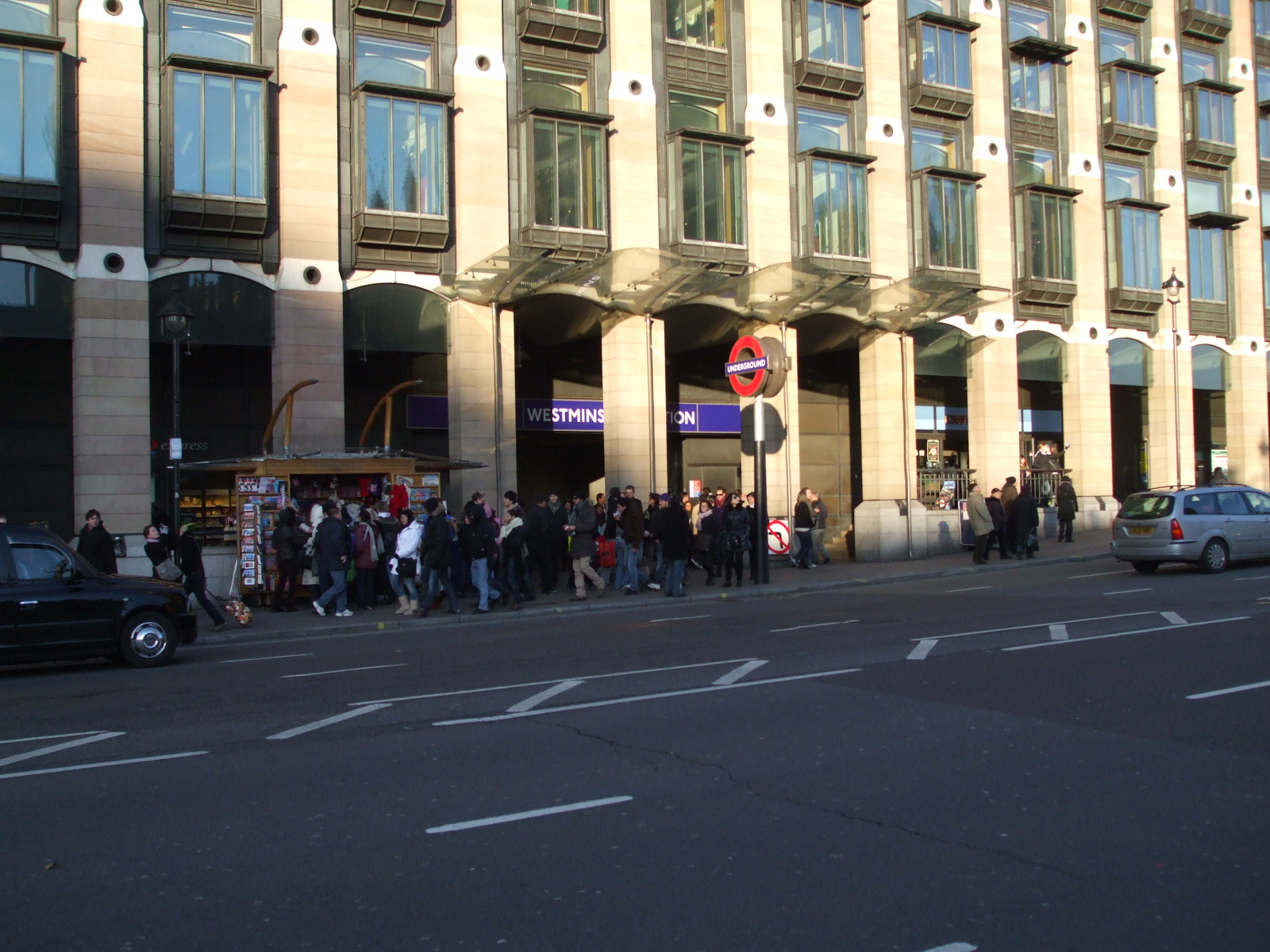
- Entrance within Portcullis House
- Interactive map of Westminster

General information
- Location: Westminster
- Local authority: City of Westminster
- Managed by: London Underground
- Number of platforms: 4
- Accessible: Yes
- Fare zone: 1
- OSI: Westminster Millennium Pier

London Underground annual entry and exit
- 2021: ▲7.70 million
- 2022: ▲17.98 million
- 2023: ▲19.17 million
- 2024: ▼18.78 million
- 2025: ▼18.56 million

Key dates
- 24 December 1868: Opened (DR)
- 1 February 1872: Started "Outer Circle" (NLR)
- 1 August 1872: Started "Middle Circle" (H&CR/DR)
- 30 June 1900: Ended "Middle Circle"
- 31 December 1908: Ended "Outer Circle"
- 1949: Started (Circle line)
- 22 December 1999: Opened (Jubilee line)

Other information
- External links: TfL station info page
- Coordinates: 51.501°N 0.125°W

Westminster is a London Underground station in the City of Westminster, England. It is served by three lines: Circle, District and Jubilee. On the Circle and District lines the station is between St James's Park and Embankment stations, and on the Jubilee line it is between Green Park and Waterloo stations. It is in London fare zone 1.

The station is located at the corner of Bridge Street and Victoria Embankment and is close to the Houses of Parliament, Big Ben, Westminster Abbey, Parliament Square, Whitehall, Westminster Bridge, and the London Eye. Also close by are Downing Street, the Cenotaph, Westminster Millennium Pier, the Treasury, the Foreign and Commonwealth Office, and the Supreme Court.

The station is in two parts: sub-surface platforms opened in 1868 by the District Railway (DR) as part of the company's first section of the Inner Circle route and deep level platforms opened in 1999 as part of the Jubilee line extension from Green Park to Stratford. A variety of underground and main line services have operated over the sub-surface tracks, but the original station was completely rebuilt in conjunction with the construction of the deep level platforms and Portcullis House, which sits above the station.

== History ==
=== Circle & District line platforms ===
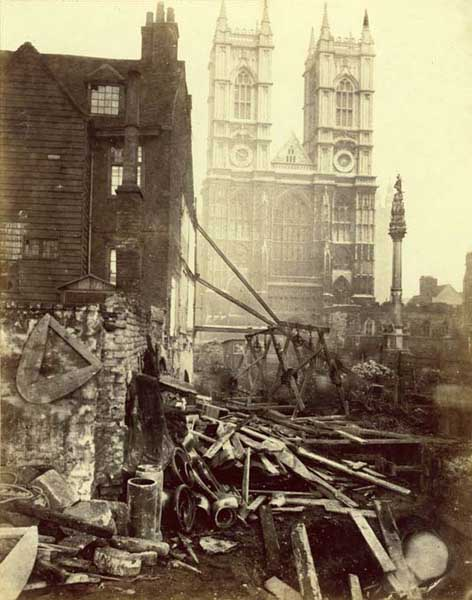
Tothill Street

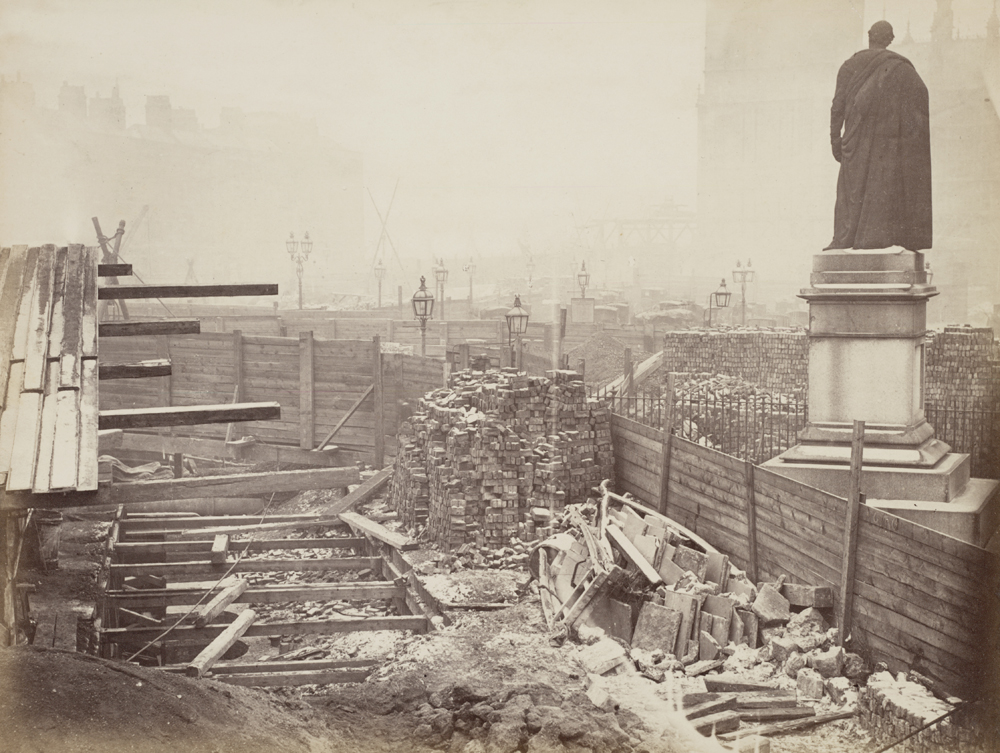
Parliament Square

Construction of the District Railway
near Westminster station, 1866

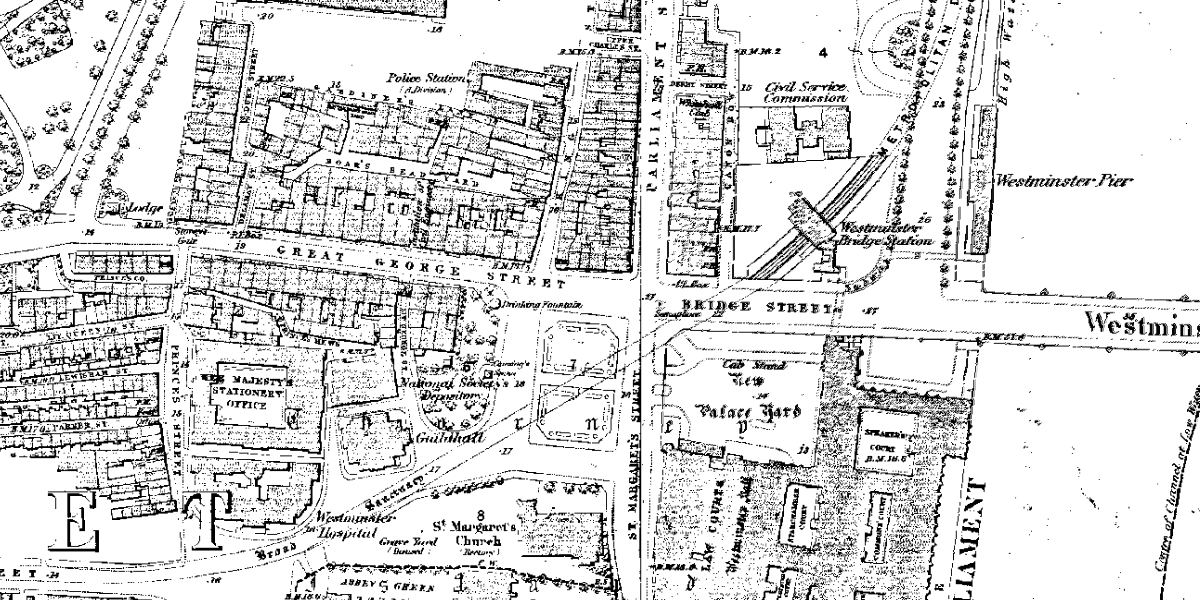
Ordnance Survey map showing Westminster station in 1878

The station was opened as Westminster Bridge on 24 December 1868 by the steam-operated District Railway (DR) (now the District line) when the railway opened the first section of its line from South Kensington. It was originally the eastern terminus of the DR and the station cutting ended at a concrete wall buffered by timber sleepers. The approach to the station from the west runs in cut and cover tunnel under the roadway of Broad Sanctuary and diagonally under Parliament Square. In Broad Sanctuary the tunnel is close to Westminster Abbey and St Margaret's church and care was required to avoid undermining their foundations when excavating in the poor ground found there.

The original station building was a temporary structure positioned over the tracks and the platforms were sheltered with individual awnings rather than the all-over glazed roof provided at the DR's other stations. Access to the station was via a passageway from Bridge Street and a pedestrian subway under the road. On 30 May 1870, the railway was extended to Blackfriars.

The DR connected to the Metropolitan Railway (MR, later the Metropolitan line) at South Kensington and, although the two companies were rivals, each company operated its trains over the other's tracks in a joint service known as the Inner Circle. On 1 February 1872, the DR opened a northbound branch from its station at Earl's Court to connect to the West London Extension Joint Railway (WLEJR, now the West London Line) at Addison Road (now Kensington (Olympia)). From that date the Outer Circle service began running over the DR's tracks. The service was run by the North London Railway (NLR) from its terminus at Broad Street (now demolished) in the City of London via the North London Line to Willesden Junction, then the West London Line to Addison Road and the DR to Mansion House – at that time the eastern terminus of the DR.

From 1 August 1872, the Middle Circle service also began operations through South Kensington, running from Moorgate along the MR's tracks on the north side of the Inner Circle to Paddington, then over the Hammersmith & City Railway (H&CR) track to Latimer Road, then, via a now demolished link, on the WLEJR to Addison Road and the DR to Mansion House. The service was operated jointly by the H&CR and the DR. On 30 June 1900, the Middle Circle service was shortened to terminate at Earl's Court, and, on 31 December 1908, the Outer Circle service was withdrawn from the DR tracks. As part of efforts to improve competitiveness, the DR's tracks were electrified during 1905 and new electric rolling stock was brought into use. In 1907, the station was given its present name, Westminster.

By the mid-1890s the station entrance had been incorporated into a larger building. In 1922, a new entrance and canopy was designed for the Bridge Street entrance by Charles Holden and, in 1924, he designed a plainly rendered replacement elevation for the eastern entrance on to the Embankment. These were the first of many projects by the architect for the London Electric Railway (the main forerunner of London Transport and Transport for London). The station platforms were also refurbished with new wall tiling in the green, blue, black and white tiling scheme used later by Holden on many stations of the period and still visible at neighbouring St James's Park station. In 1949, the Metropolitan line-operated Inner Circle route was given its own identity on the tube map as the Circle line.

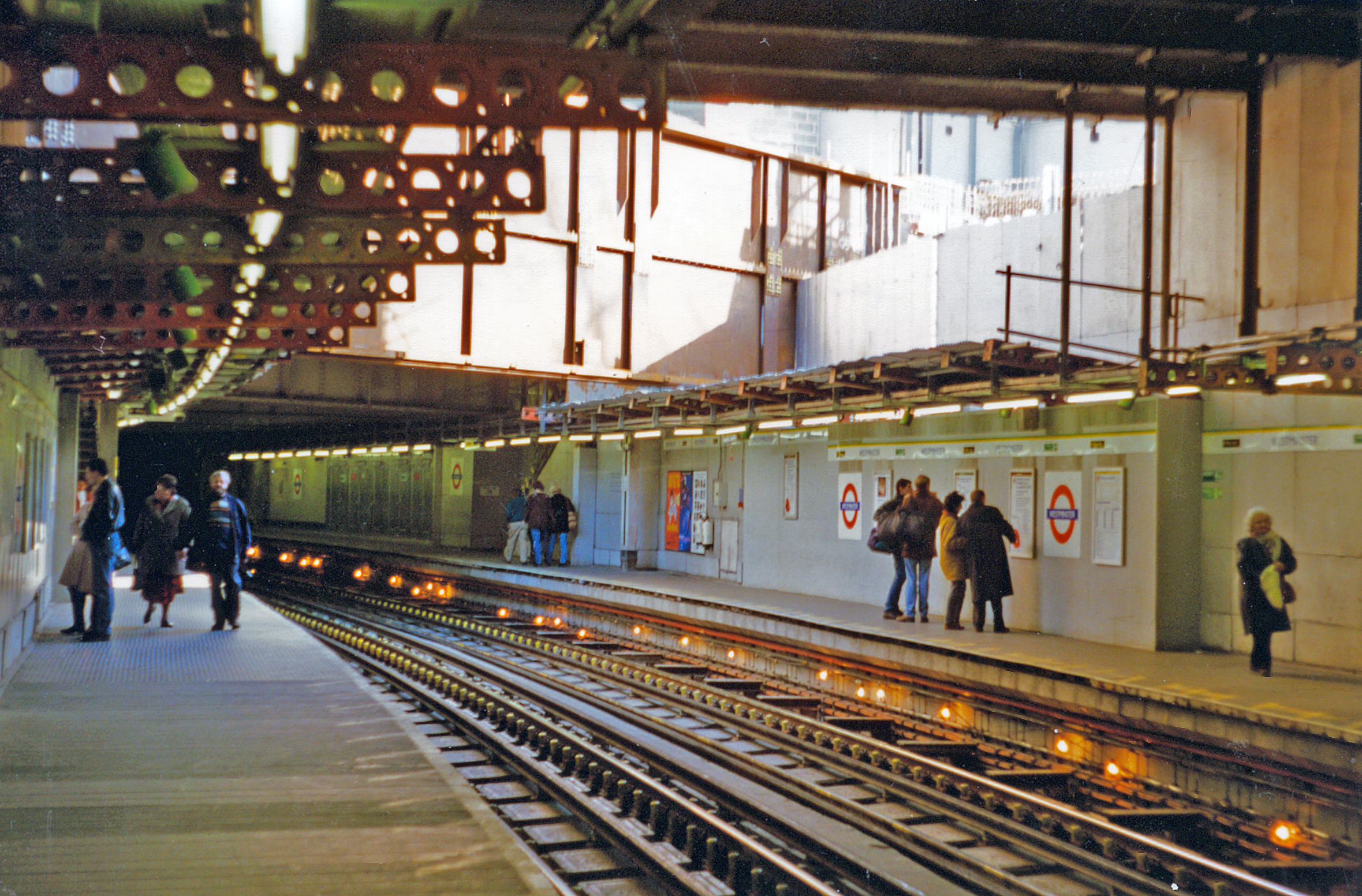
Westminster tube station during construction of the Jubilee line extension, 1996

Between late 1962 and early 1964 the east ends of the platforms were extended to allow longer 8-car trains to be operated. This involved carefully enlarging the tunnels under the Metropolitan Police's original headquarters at New Scotland Yard (now Norman Shaw Buildings). The station was completely rebuilt to incorporate new deep-level platforms for the Jubilee line when it was extended to the London Docklands in the 1990s. During the works, the level of the sub-surface platforms was lowered to enable ground level access to Portcullis House. This was achieved in small increments which were carried out when the line was closed at night.

=== Jubilee line station ===
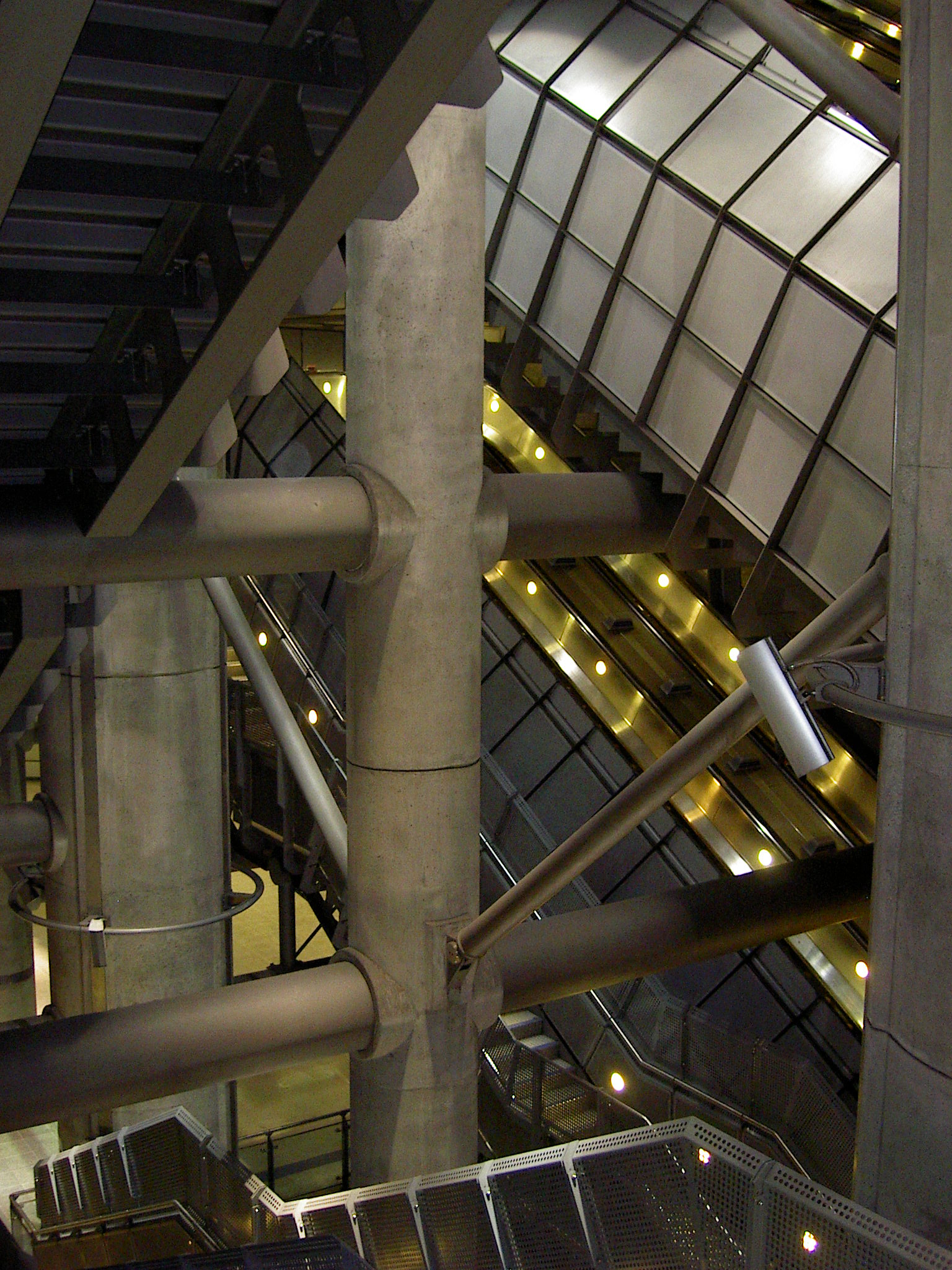
Escalators stacked above one another supported on structural columns within the depths of the deep-level Jubilee line station

When the first section of the Jubilee line was planned in the 1970s, the second phase of the project was intended to continue the line eastwards from the terminus at Charing Cross to the City of London, Woolwich and Thamesmead. Westminster station would not have been on this planned route, but the need to provide transport infrastructure for the redevelopment of the London Docklands in east and south-east London led to a redirection of the route to run via Westminster to connect Waterloo and London Bridge stations with the new developments. For the Jubilee Line Extension, the buildings around the station were demolished and the sub-surface station was completely reconstructed together with the erection of a parliamentary office building, Portcullis House, which sits above the station. Both projects were designed by Michael Hopkins & Partners.

The construction of the deep-level station involved the excavation of a 39-metre (128 ft) deep void around and beneath the sub-surface station to house the escalators to the Jubilee line platforms. The void, known as the station box, was the deepest ever excavation in central London and was carried out between thick reinforced concrete diaphragm walls stiffened and braced horizontally for stability. Under Bridge Street, on the south side of the station box, the two Jubilee line platform tunnels are arranged with the westbound platform below the eastbound. The depth of the station box excavation and the proximity of the tunnels represented a significant risk to the stability of the foundation of the Houses of Parliament's clock tower (commonly known as Big Ben), which stands only 34 metres (112 ft) from the edge of the station box. To protect the foundation and manage settlement in the sub-soil, a series of 50-metre (160 ft) long steel tubes were installed horizontally around and beneath the clock tower's 3-metre (9.8 ft) thick foundation. The tubes were provided with a control system through which grout was injected into the ground to compensate for settlement detected from detailed measurements of the clock tower's position. As excavation of the station box and the tunnels took place, grout was injected on 22 occasions between January 1996 and September 1997. The process limited the movement of the clock tower to an acceptable maximum of 35 millimetres (1.4 in). Without the grout injection, the movement would have been at least 120 millimetres (4.7 in) causing cracking to the structure of the tower and the Houses of Parliament. The Jubilee line platforms were opened on 22 December 1999, although trains had been running through the station without stopping since 20 November 1999.

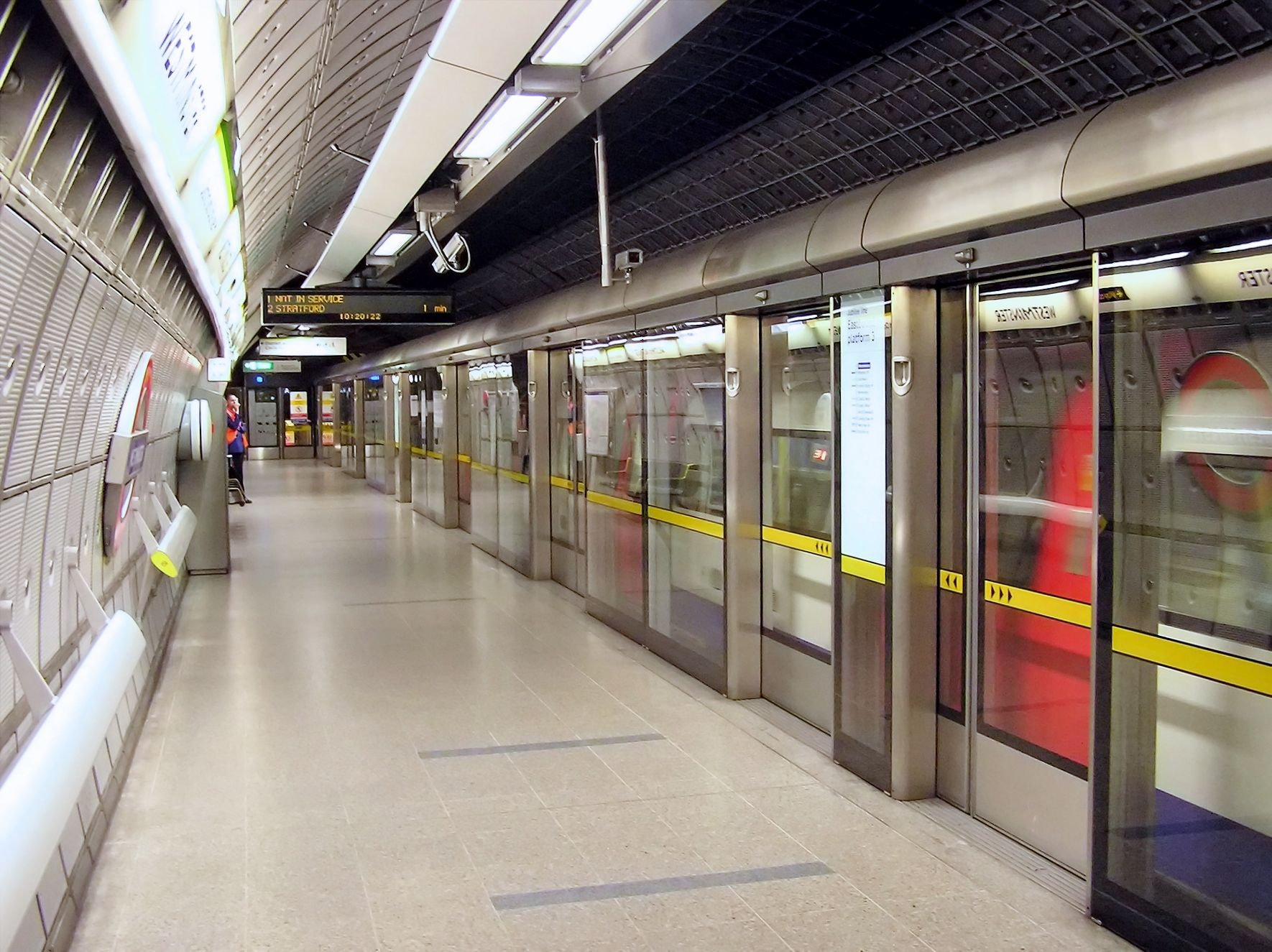
Platform edge doors for the Jubilee line in eastbound platform 3

The station's architecture is an austere combination of concrete and stainless steel, conforming to no definite architectural style, but it does combine elements of the bowellist, brutalist and deconstructivist paradigms, with stacked banks of escalators supported from the cross-bracing structures spanning the station box and routes for passengers entering or leaving the station separated from those changing between lines. (Note: Because of the depth of the station box, 17 escalators and five lifts are needed to connect the four platforms to each other and to the ticket hall.) As with the other underground stations on the extension, the Jubilee line platforms feature platform edge doors to improve airflow through the system and increase safety. The station design won a number of awards including Civic Trust awards in 2000 and 2002, the Royal Fine Art Commission Millennium Building of the Year award in 2000 and the RIBA Award for Architecture in 2001. Both projects were jointly short-listed in 2001 for the RIBA's prestigious Stirling Prize.

In July 2003, the Royal Navy unveiled a plaque of HMS Westminster in the station concourse, commemorating the relationship between London Underground and Navy.

=== Design icon ===
As part of the Transported by Design programme of activities, on 15 October 2015, after two months of public voting, Westminster tube station was elected by Londoners as one of the 10 favourite transport design icons.

== Services ==
Westminster station is on the Circle, District and Jubilee lines in London fare zone 1. On the Circle and District lines the station is between St James's Park and Embankment, and on the Jubilee line it is between Green Park and Waterloo. Train frequencies vary throughout the day, but generally District line trains operate every 2–6 minutes from approximately 05:25 to 00:38 eastbound and 05:49 to 00:37 westbound; they are supplemented by Circle line trains every 8–12 minutes from approximately 05:49 to 00:24 clockwise and 05:36 to 00:19 anticlockwise. Jubilee line trains operate every 2–5 minutes from approximately 05:28 to 00:48 eastbound and 05:38 to 00:31 northbound.

== Connections ==
A variety of London Buses routes serve the station throughout the day and night.

== In popular culture ==
Westminster tube station appears in the 2007 film Harry Potter and the Order of the Phoenix, when Arthur Weasley accompanies Harry to his trial at the Ministry of Magic.

Preceding station	London Underground	Following station
St James's Park towards Edgware Road via Victoria	Circle line	Embankment towards Hammersmith via Tower Hill
St James's Park towards Wimbledon, Richmond or Ealing Broadway	District line	Embankment towards Upminster
Green Park towards Stanmore	Jubilee line	Waterloo towards Stratford
