= Ann Curnow =

Ann Curnow QC
- Born: Ann Marguerite Curnow; 5 June 1935; Burbage
- Died: 11 May 2011 (aged 75); St Thomas
- Occupation: barrister
- Known for: UK judge and leading barrister
- Spouse: Neil Denison

(Elizabeth) Ann Marguerite Curnow (5 June 1935 – 11 May 2011) was a United Kingdom barrister and judge

== Life ==
Curnow was born to Cecil and Doris Curnow in Burbage near Hinckley in 1935. Her father was an aircraftman who died as a Japanese prisoner of war after being shot down on a flight over Java during the second world war.

She joined Gray's Inn in 1954 and was Called to the Bar in 1957. She was one of three women Called to the Bar that year. The others were Jean Southworth and Ann Goddard and they were to have similar careers. Curnow married Neil Denison who was another lawyer. She practised criminal law and rose to be a Queen's Counsel in 1985, as well as a Master of the Bench of Gray's Inn.

Curnow dealt with some harrowing cases: for example, in 2000 she prosecuted two teenage sisters who had befriended and later fatally attacked an 87-year-old woman and in 2002 she prosecuted a couple who had tortured and neglected their two-year-old daughter to death. She kept a professional profile in court, but she was known for the support she gave to younger lawyers. She saw herself as a mentor, rather than seeing them as potential rivals.

Curnow was known for her deep voice and her cigarette habit. She retired in 2005 after having a leg amputated due to poor circulation. Gray's Inn Hall installed "the Curnow Rail" to allow people with similar disabilities to enter at her suggestion.

In 2019, Gray's Inn unveiled a scholarship in Curnow's name; the Elizabeth Ann Curnow Scholarship is a financial award to support students studying the professional qualification of the Bar.
