= John McAslan =

British architect

John McAslan CBE FRSA FRIAS RSA FICE FRSE FAIA FRICS
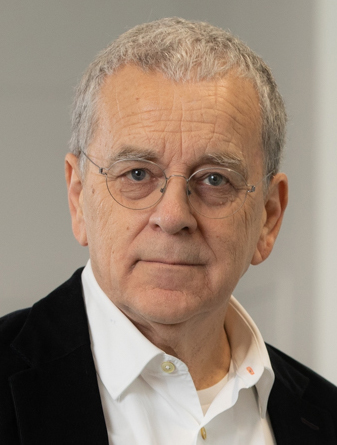
- Born: John Renwick McAslan; 16 February 1954 (age 72); Glasgow, Scotland
- Education: Dunoon Grammar School; Dollar Academy; University of Edinburgh
- Occupation: Architect
- Practice: John McAslan + Partners

John Renwick McAslan (born 16 February 1954) is a British architect.

== Early life and education ==
King's Cross Station, Western concourse

Born in Glasgow, John McAslan was educated at Dunoon Grammar School, Dollar Academy and the University of Edinburgh. He trained in Boston, USA, with Cambridge Seven Associates before joining Richard Rogers and Partners.

== Career ==
McAslan founded John McAslan + Partners in 1993, and the practice has studios worldwide: London, Edinburgh, Sydney and New York City.

John McAslan's early career working with hi-tech architects manifests itself in the studio's process-led approach to design and an "expertise in blending historical reverence with modern architectural practice".

The practice also undertakes humanitarian work in Rwanda, India, Haiti and Malawi and in the UK.

Succession plans were announced in 2024, handing the ownership of the practice to the senior team with McAslan staying on as Executive Chair.

== Philanthropy ==
In 1997 McAslan and his wife Dava Sagenkahn established the John McAslan Family Trust, a registered charity which provides support for arts and educational projects both in the UK and overseas.

In 2004, John McAslan + Partners, the Royal Institute of British Architects (RIBA) and the Institution of Civil Engineers (ICE) jointly established a new bursary to recognise and support innovative design projects.

In 2019 John McAslan + Partners and the American Institute of Architects jointly launched the McAslan Architecture Travel Fellowship

== Haiti ==
The John McAslan Family Trust first supported students and graduates to carry out small school and community projects in Haiti. In the aftermath of the devastating 2010 Haiti Earthquake, John McAslan and Partners took on the restoration of the historic Marche en Fer. One year after the earthquake it reopened for trade, becoming the first large scale building to be restored in the city.

In 2010 John McAslan and Partners was appointed by the Haitian Government to contribute to the rebuilding in Haiti as part of the international response. In 2011 the ‘Building Back Better Communities in Haiti’ Housing Expo was launched in showing modular designs for 60 house types and community buildings that could be used to help rebuild communities and homes in Haiti.

During this work, the World Monuments Fund and the British Embassy in the Dominican Republic and Haiti engaged the practice to study the traditional Gingerbread Houses of Haiti. Maison Gauthier – home of the Haitian dancer and choreographer – was used as a case study. The house was documented as typical of its sort, and structurally stabilised as part of the project, using a grant from the UK Government's Ambassadors Fund.

McAslan was named in 2012–2013 as Honorary Consul for the Republic of Haiti in London.

== Notable projects ==
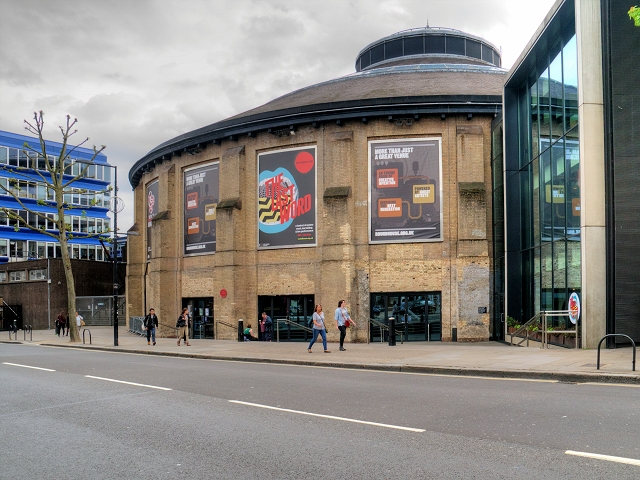
The Roundhouse, London

=== The Roundhouse, London (2006) ===
The Grade II listed, former steam engine turntable house became used in the 1960s and 70s as a music and theatre venue.

The 2006 renovation restored and upgraded the building as a contemporary auditorium, with studios and community learning facilities in the basement, and a "glassy" three-storey wing added to house the box office, bar and café, an art gallery foyer and offices.

=== Iron Market, Port-au-Prince, Haiti (2011) ===
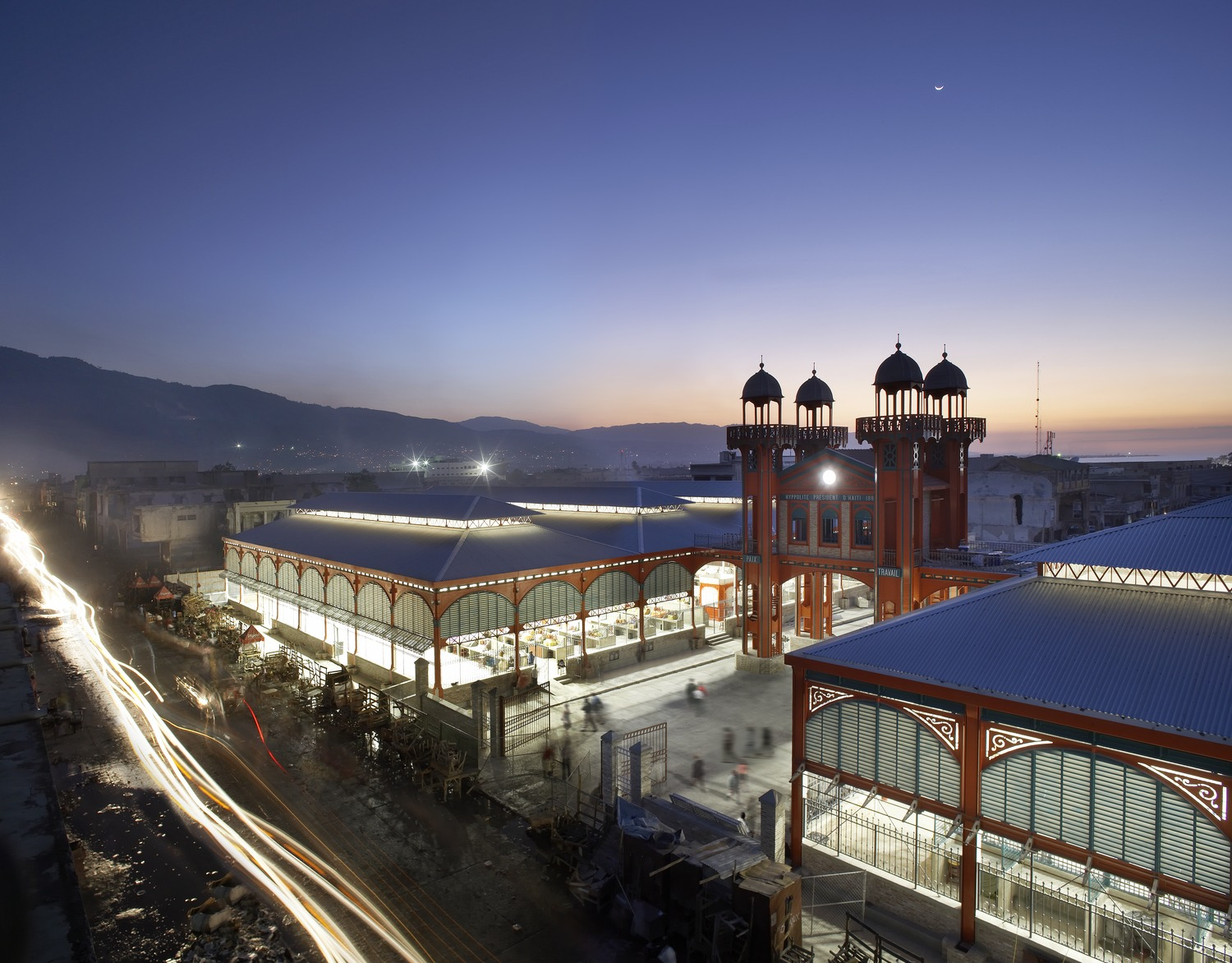
Iron Market, Haiti

Work to rebuild and restore the Iron Market in Port-au-Prince was part of the international earthquake response following the 2010 Haiti earthquake. Restoring and upgrading the market to current seismic requirements, it reopened a year after the earthquake. The landmark building is made up of two 25,000sqft market halls separated by an open courtyard and a clock tower pavilion flanked by four minarets. The reopening of the market symbolised a renewed economic confidence in Haiti and was internationally recognised for its restoration.

=== King's Cross Station, London (2012) ===
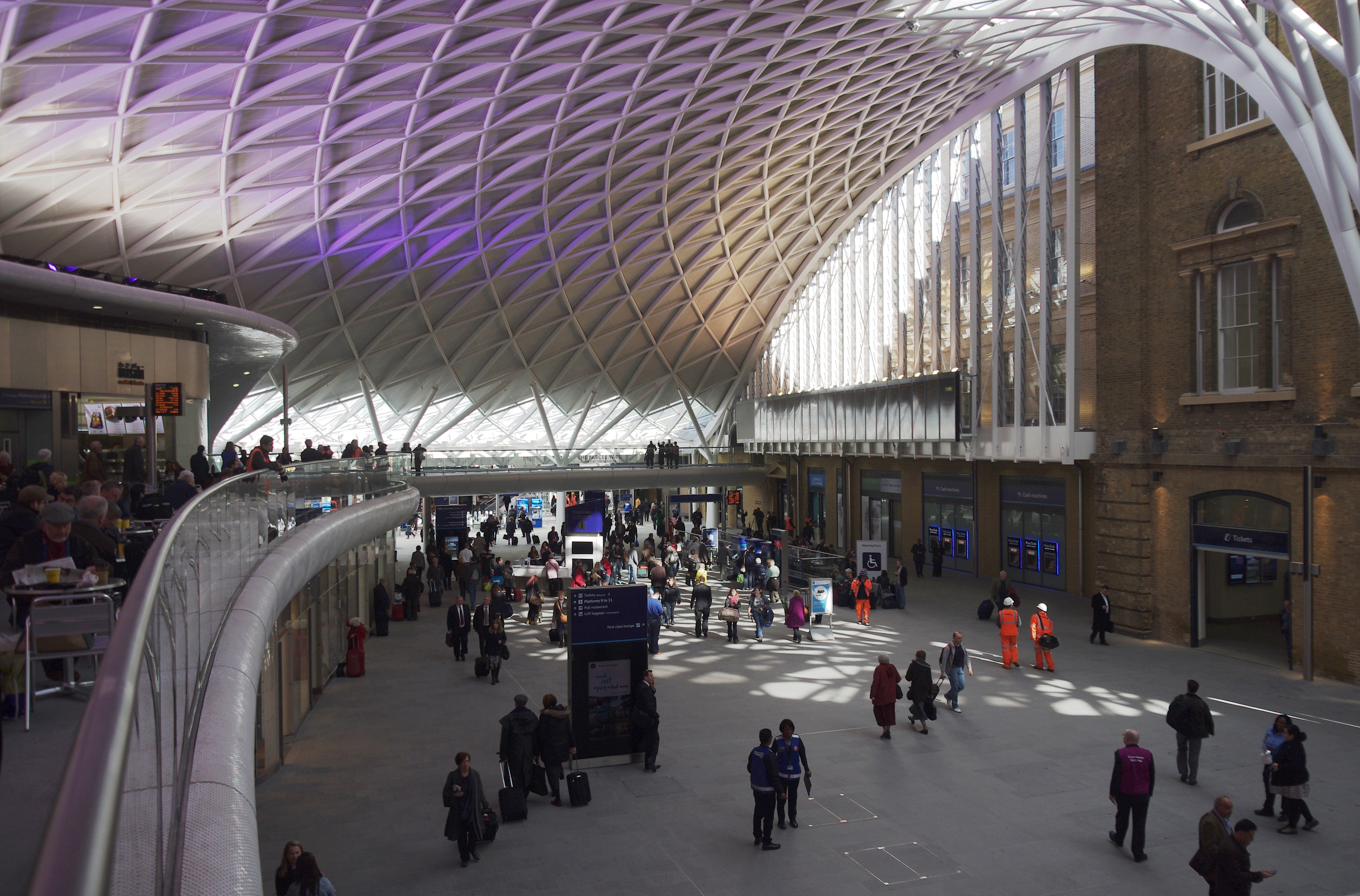
King's Cross Station, London

Reaching 20 metres above ground level, the treelike diagrid roof – engineered by Arup – integrates with the historic station buildings, to shelter a redeveloped 150 metre long concourse. The addition stands independently of the historic station structure and is fully reversible. The concourse changed how it connected to the London Underground, as well as making space for retail and ticket offices.

The station redevelopment was completed in time for the 2012 London Olympics. It was the first move in the Kings Cross Masterplan that has completely transformed the area.

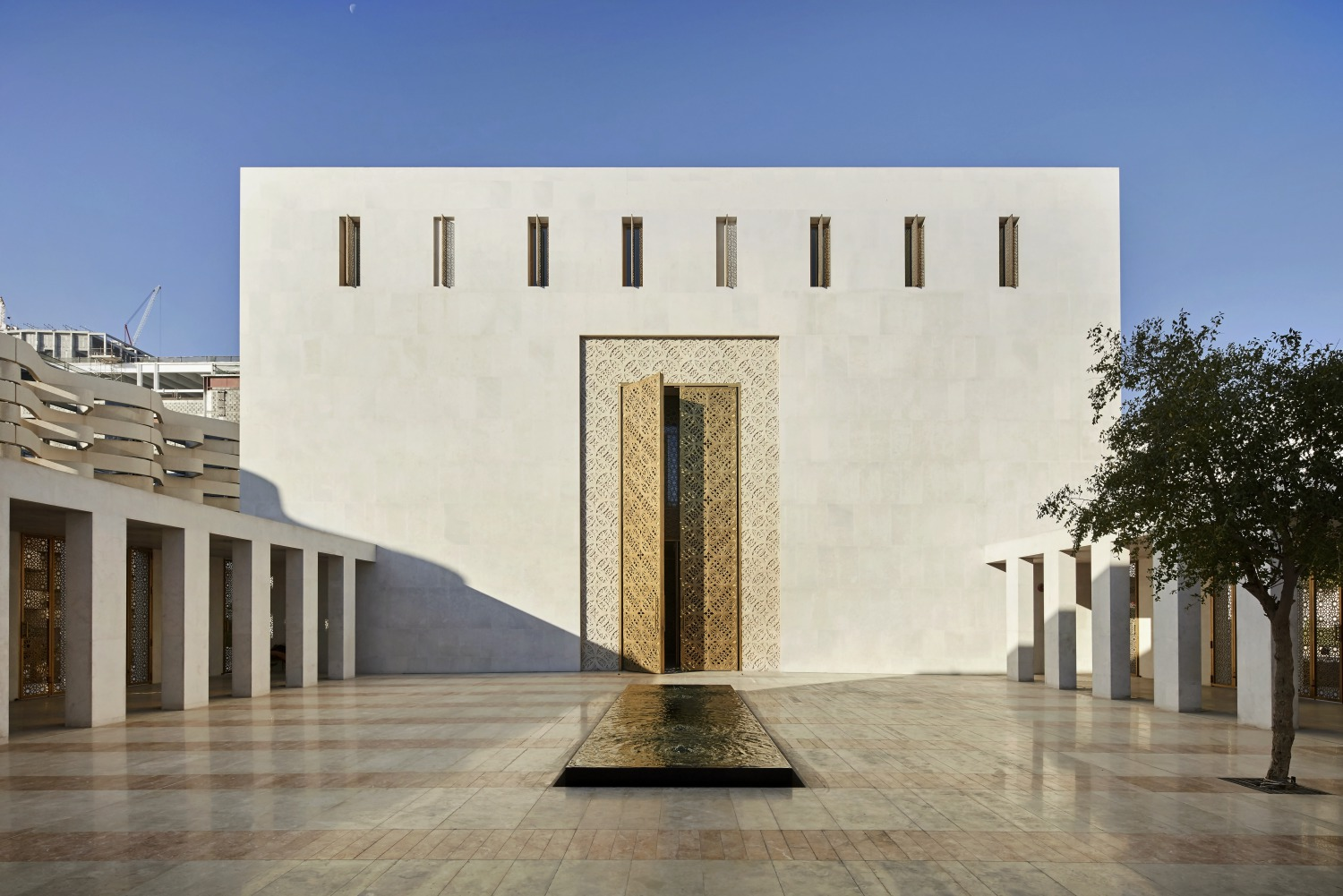
Jumaa Mosque

=== Jumaa Mosque, Doha (2015) ===
Within the new Msheireb Heritage Quarter of Historic Doha, the mosque takes the form of a white cube, with accompanying 25.2m minaret. It is inspired by classical Islamic architechtecture and adheres closely to "Islamic principles – light, water, pattern, entry and procession", filtered through a modernist lens. The building is the first LEED Gold certificated stand alone mosque.

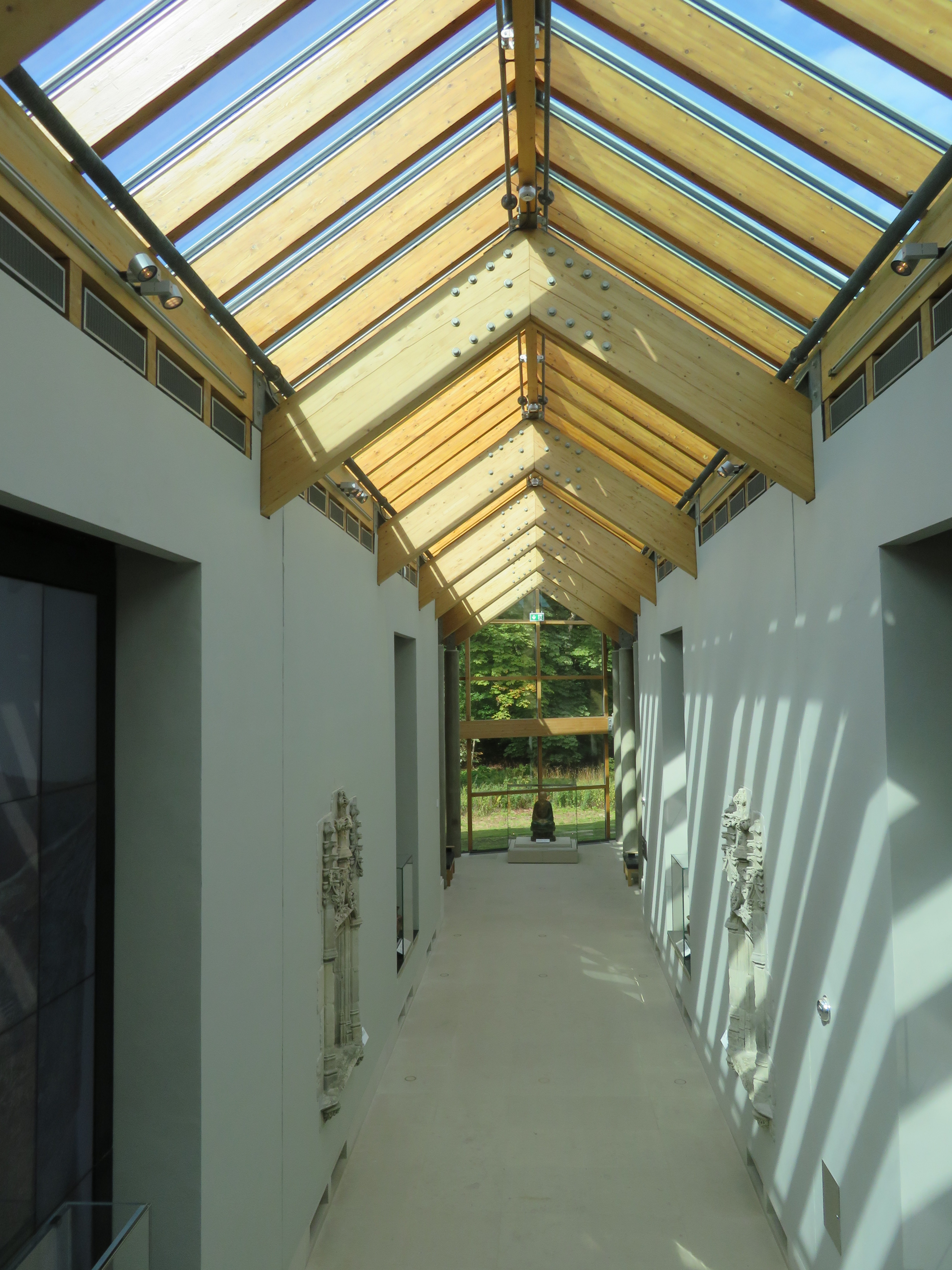
The Burrell Collection

=== The Burrell Collection, Glasgow, (2022) ===
Restoration and modernisation of the Category A-Listed Burrell Collection in Glasgow.

The modernist building, by Barry Gasson, was repaired and its energy efficiency improved, as well as the interior reordered for it to be able to display more of the Museum collection and welcome a larger and more diverse group of visitors. A new atrium opened up in the centre of the buildings, which was described by the RIAS judges as "considered, delightful and dynamic" and went on to win the Art Fund Museum of the Year Prize in 2023.

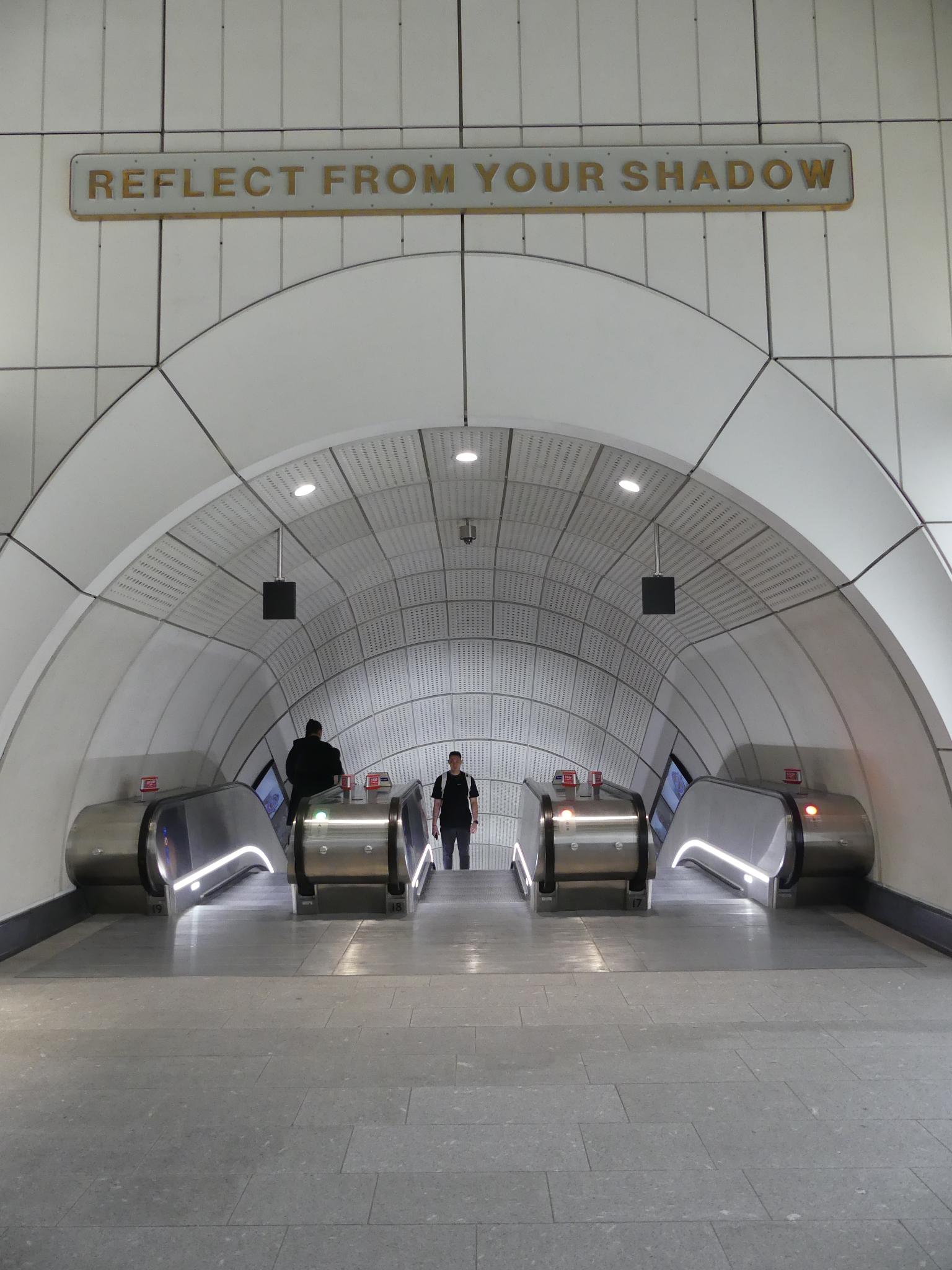
Bond Street Station, Elizabeth Line

=== Elizabeth Line Bond Street station (2022) ===
Bond Street station contains two ground level ticket halls, at either end of two deep east–west platforms at Hanover Square and Davies Street. The two spacious, colonnaded stations reflect the Georgian and Edwardian architectural styles and materials of their neighbouring buildings, with high ceilings, and natural materials. The station is one of the busiest on the Elizabeth line, connecting to London's Mayfair district. The Elizabeth Line - including Bond Street Station - won the RIBA Stirling Prize in 2024.

=== Grand Central Station, Belfast (2023) ===
Belfast's multi-modal transport hub replaced the former city centre bus and railway stations to make a combined gateway transport hub and support a 50% increase in capacity - equivalent to 20 million journeys annually. It is made of glass and steel, and includes a large concourse and public square. Architects Journal states that it was created to "help knit together neighbourhoods once fractured along political, religious and social lines." It was designed with Arup Group and Juno.

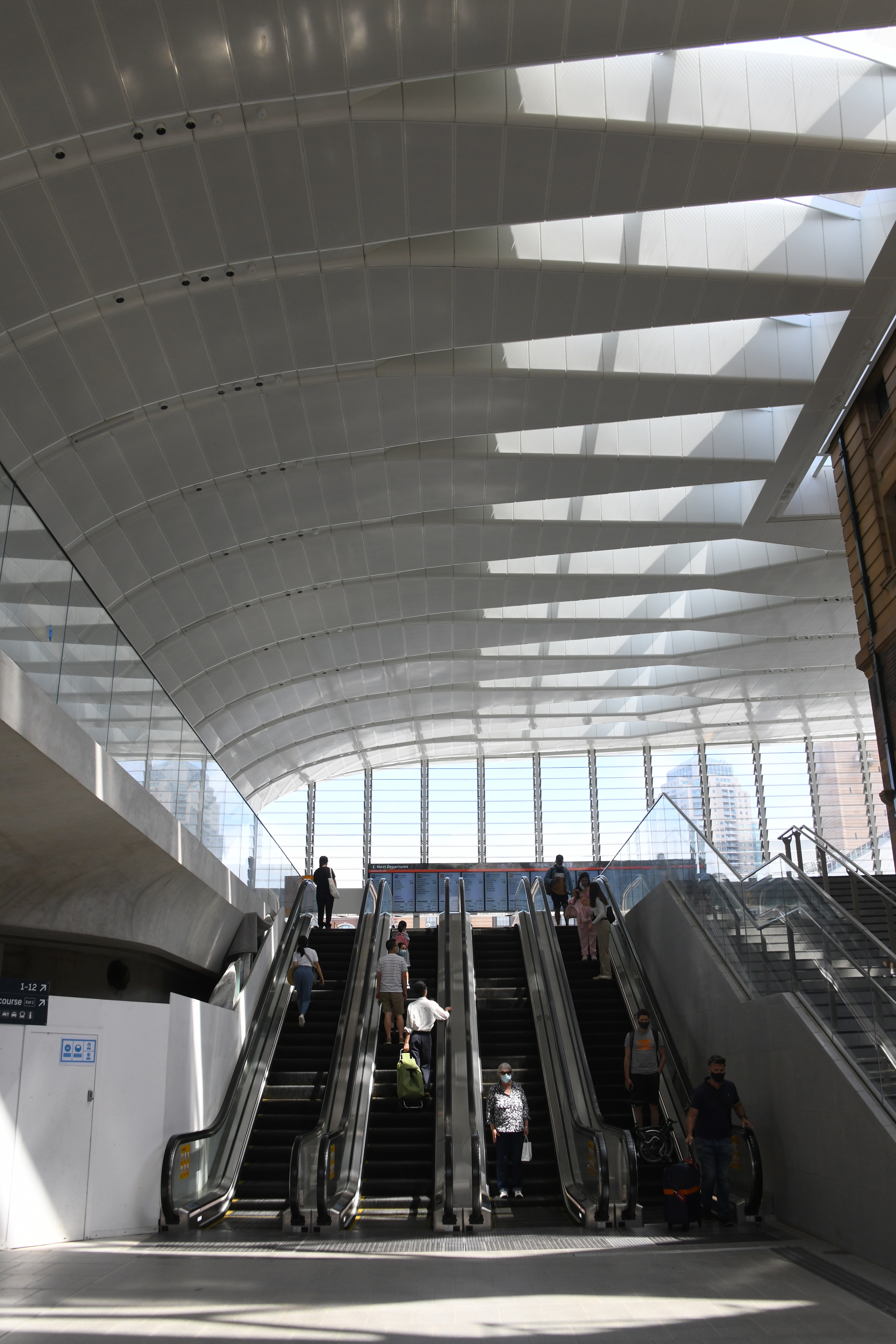
Sydney Metro, Central Station, Sydney

=== Sydney Metro, Central Station, (2023) ===
The expansion of the city's metro network, including two new City Line metro platforms under Central Station was the catalyst to an upgrade of the historic station. The new north concourse, described as "a spectacular new public space" by Wallpaper magazine, are over-sailed by a 50m-span vaulted roof. The station was designed to allow the capacity of the station to grow from 260,000 to 450,000 passengers use the station daily in ten years. The designs were a collaboration with Woods Bagot.

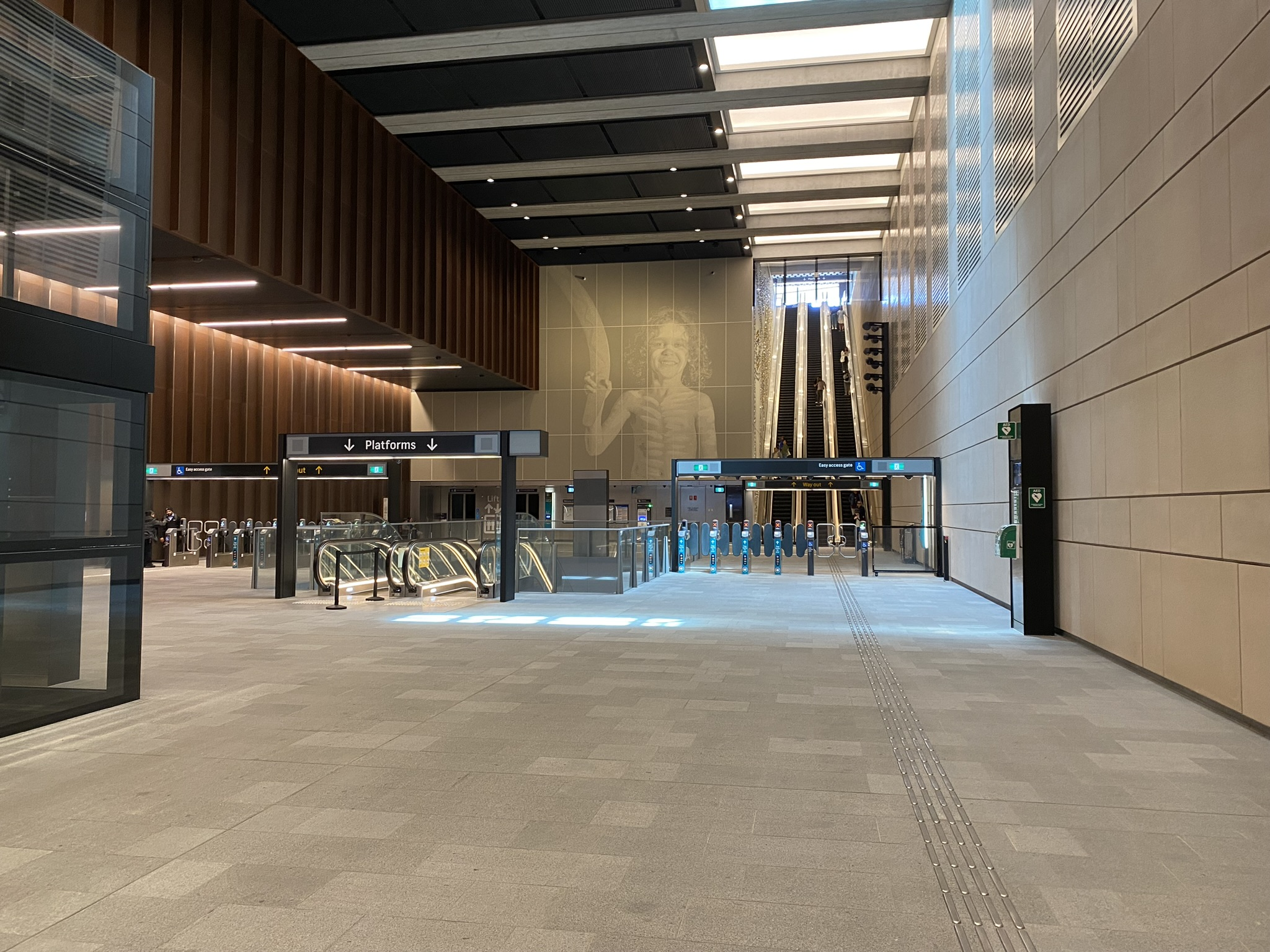
Waterloo Station, Sydney

=== Waterloo Station, Sydney Metro (2024) ===
Waterloo Station was a new addition to the Sydney Metro and occupies an entire city block. Within the station, collaborations with local artists aim to incorporate the area's Indigenous identity into the station's design, which is highlighted through architectural details, decorative elements and artworks by indigenous artist Nicole Monks within the station.

=== BM_ARC, The British Museum Archaeological Research Collection, Reading (2024) ===
The collections and research facility for the British Museum houses 1.5m archaeology collection items previously stored in Blythe House. Run in partnership with Reading University, one of the stated aims of moving the collections to Reading was to make more artefacts more accessible to researchers and the general public, digitally, as contextual assemblages and individually.

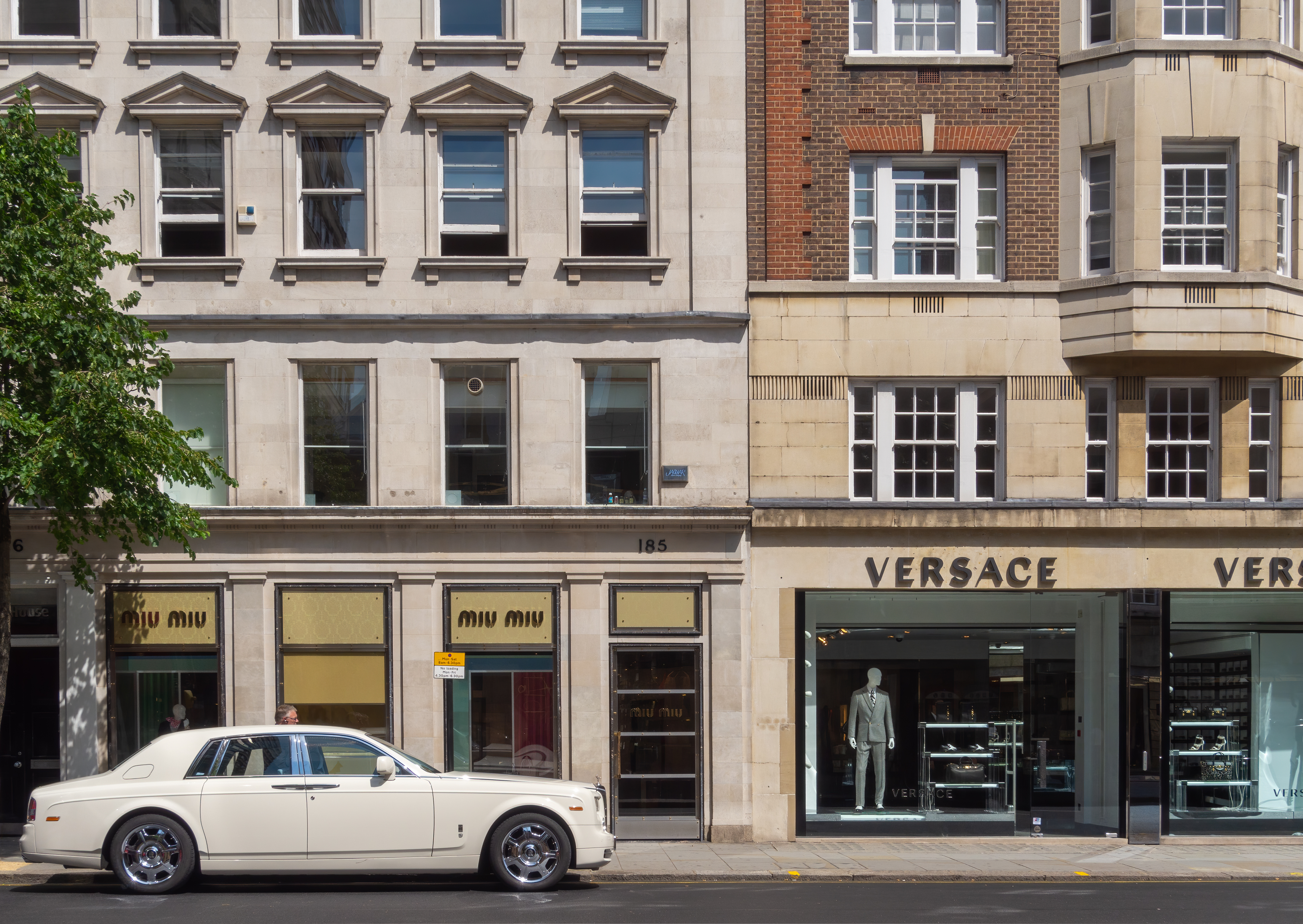
Sloane Street, London

=== Sloane Street Masterplan (2025) ===
The masterplan for Chelsea's 1 km long luxury shopping street shifted the priority from vehicle to pedestrian, with wider pavements, lighting and new street furniture as well as a planting scheme overseen by Chelsea Flower Show award winner Andy Sturgeon that aims to turn it into a "green boulevard".

=== Global Leadership Centre, University of Oxford (2026) ===
Funded by Wafïc Saïd, the Global Leadership Centre in the Saïd Business School repurposes a Victorian power station to create what the University of Oxford describes as a "physical and digital hub for leaders which will be a dynamic environment in which to design powerful new leadership models for the 21st Century". The retrofitted building is set to house teaching facilities, a 120-bed residential wing, and an ‘agora’, in the former turbine hall. It is due to complete in 2026.

== Honours and awards ==
John McAslan & Partners was named World Architect of the Year in 2009 by Building Design magazine.

McAslan was appointed Commander of the Order of the British Empire in the New Year Honours 2012, for his services to architecture. In 2014, he was appointed Regent to the University of Edinburgh, and was awarded an honorary degree of Doctor honoris causa in 2015. In 2019 McAslan was elected a Fellow of the Royal Society of Edinburgh.
