= Mansion House tube station =

London Underground station

Mansion House
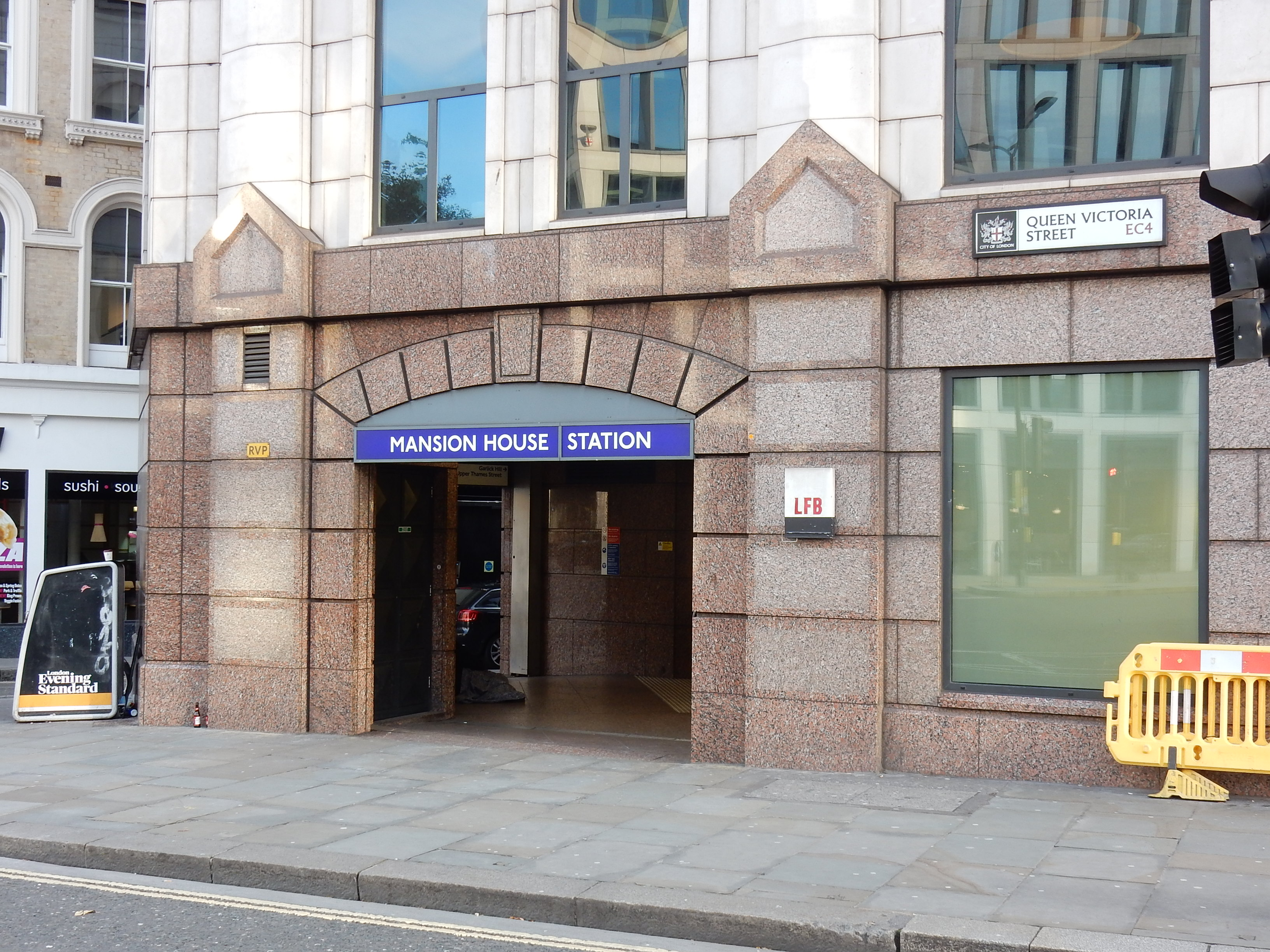
- Entrance on Queen Victoria Street
- Interactive map of Mansion House

General information
- Location: Queen Victoria Street/Cannon Street
- Local authority: City of London
- Managed by: London Underground
- Number of platforms: 2
- Fare zone: 1
- OSI: Blackfriars; Cannon Street

London Underground annual entry and exit
- 2020: ▼1.07 million
- 2021: ▲2.09 million
- 2022: ▲4.14 million
- 2023: ▲4.38 million
- 2024: ▲4.50 million

Key dates
- 3 July 1871: Opened as terminus (MDR)
- 1 February 1872: Started "Outer Circle" (NLR)
- 1 August 1872: Started "Middle Circle" (H&CR/MDR)
- 10 October 1884: Extended east, "Inner Circle" completed
- 30 June 1900: Ended "Middle Circle"
- 31 December 1908: Ended "Outer Circle"
- 1949: Started (Circle line)
- 29 October 1989: Closed for rebuilding
- 11 February 1991: Reopened

Other information
- External links: TfL station info page
- Coordinates: 51.5122°N 0.0941°W

Mansion House is a London Underground station in the City of London which takes its name from Mansion House, the official residence of the Lord Mayor of London. It opened in 1871 as the eastern terminus of the Metropolitan District Railway. Today, Mansion House is served by the Circle and District lines. It is between Blackfriars and Cannon Street stations and it is in London fare zone 1. The station is located at the junction of Queen Victoria Street and Cannon Street.

Mansion House is a sub-surface station with three platforms. The westbound platform, number 1, and the eastbound platform, number 3, are shared by both the Circle and District lines. A third platform was used for terminating eastbound trains, however it is no longer used and the track removed as services continue and terminate at Tower Hill.

Despite the station's name, it is not the nearest tube station to the Mansion House itself, which is in fact directly opposite an entrance to Bank station. Moreover, two other stations on the same District and Circle lines (Cannon Street and Monument) are also nearer to the Mansion House than its namesake.

== History ==
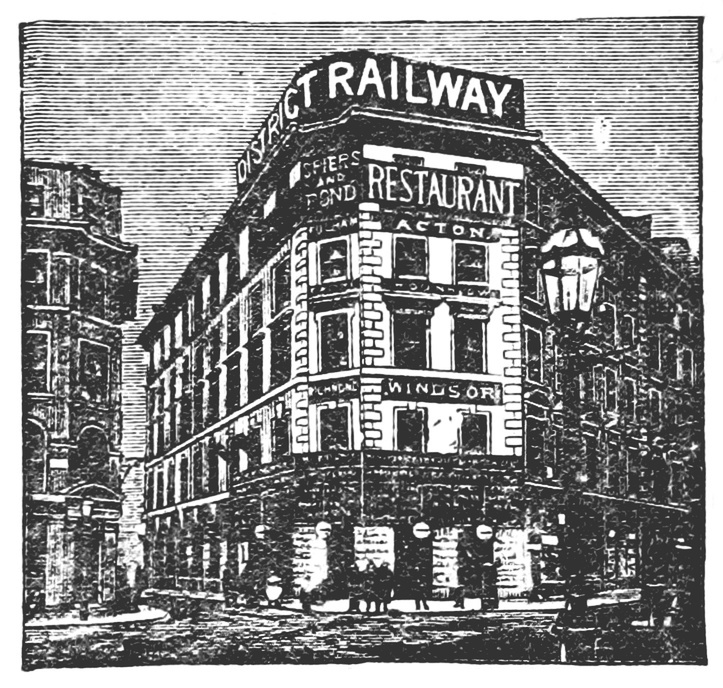
Mansion House station depicted in 1888

Mansion House station was authorised by the Metropolitan District Railway Act 1870 (33 & 34 Vict. c. xciv), and opened on 3 July 1871 by the Metropolitan District Railway (MDR, now the District line) when the company extended its line eastwards from St. Paul's station (which is now named Blackfriars). Mansion House became the new eastern terminus of the MDR. The MDR connected to the Metropolitan Railway (MR, now the Metropolitan line) at South Kensington and, although the two companies were rivals, each company operated its trains over the other's tracks in a joint service known as the "Inner Circle".

On 1 February 1872, the MDR opened a northbound branch from its station at Earl's Court to connect to the West London Extension Joint Railway (WLEJR, now the West London line) which it connected to at Addison Road station (now named Kensington (Olympia)). From that date the "Outer Circle" service began running over the MDR's tracks. The service was run by the North London Railway (NLR) from its terminus at Broad Street (now demolished) via the North London Line to Willesden Junction, then the West London Line to Addison Road and the MDR to Mansion House.

From 1 August 1872, the "Middle Circle" service also began operations through Westminster running from Moorgate along the MR's tracks on the north side of the Inner Circle to Paddington then over the Hammersmith & City Railway (H&CR) track to Latimer Road, then, via a now demolished link, to the West London Line to Addison Road and the MDR to Mansion House. The service was operated jointly by the H&CR and the MDR.

From 1 March 1883, the District operated a service between Mansion House and Windsor, using Great Western Railway tracks from a junction installed just east of Ealing Broadway station, but it was unremunerative and ceased on 30 September 1885. On 10 October 1884, the MDR and the MR jointly opened the line eastwards to Mark Lane (closed 1967), thereby completing the "Inner Circle". The first penny chocolate vending machine in the country was installed in the station in July 1886.

In 1897 the MDR obtained parliamentary permission to construct a deep-level railway running between Gloucester Road and Mansion House, beneath the existing sub-surface line. This new line was to be an express route using electric trains to relieve congestion on the sub-surface tracks. Mansion House was to be the terminus of the express route, with platforms 71 feet (22 m) below the sub-surface ones. No immediate work was carried out on the deep-level line, and the subsequent take over of the MDR by the Underground Electric Railways Company of London (UERL) and the resignalling and electrification of the MDR's routes between 1903 and 1905 meant that congestion was relieved without needing to construct the deep-level line. The plan was dropped in 1908.

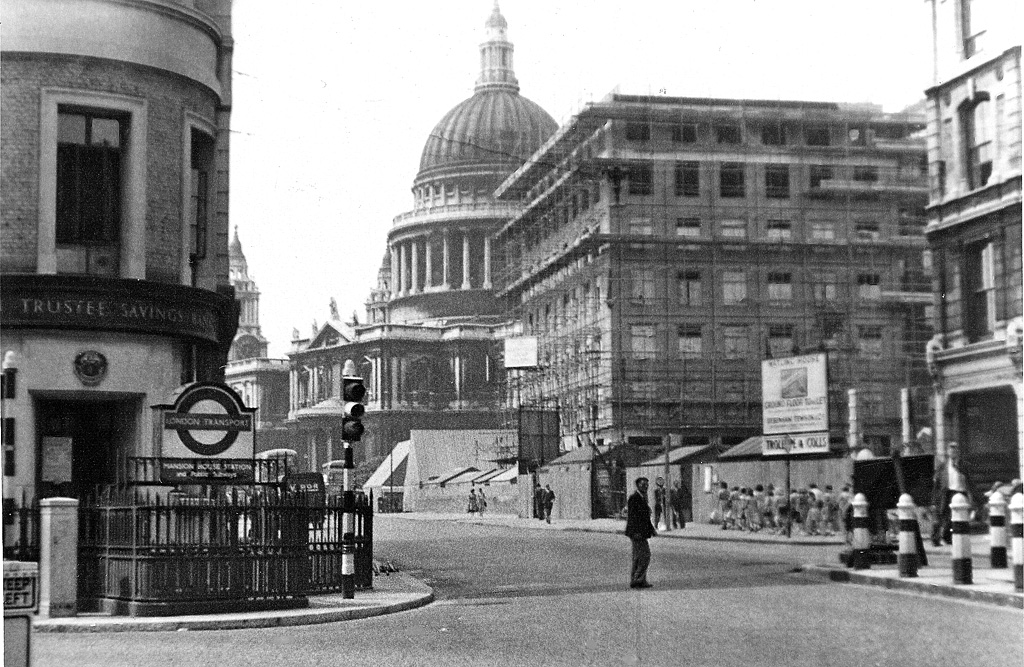
1955 view of entrance on Cannon Street

On 30 June 1900, the "Middle Circle" service was withdrawn between Earl's Court and Mansion House. On 31 December 1908, the "Outer Circle" service was also withdrawn. In the 1920s Mansion House station's entrance was rebuilt to a design by Charles Holden. It featured a tall glazed screen with the Underground roundel similar to his station designs for the extension to Morden of the City & South London Railway (now the Northern line) opened between 1924 and 1926. In 1949, the Metropolitan line-operated "Inner Circle" was given its own identity on the Tube map as the Circle line.

On 29 October 1989, the station was closed for the construction of a new entrance and for further renovation. It reopened on 11 February 1991. During the weekend of 8–9 October 2016 the west-facing bay platform number 2 was decommissioned and the track removed; all District line trains now continue to Tower Hill. As of 2018 the hydraulic buffer at the east end of platform 2 is still in place.

== Connections ==
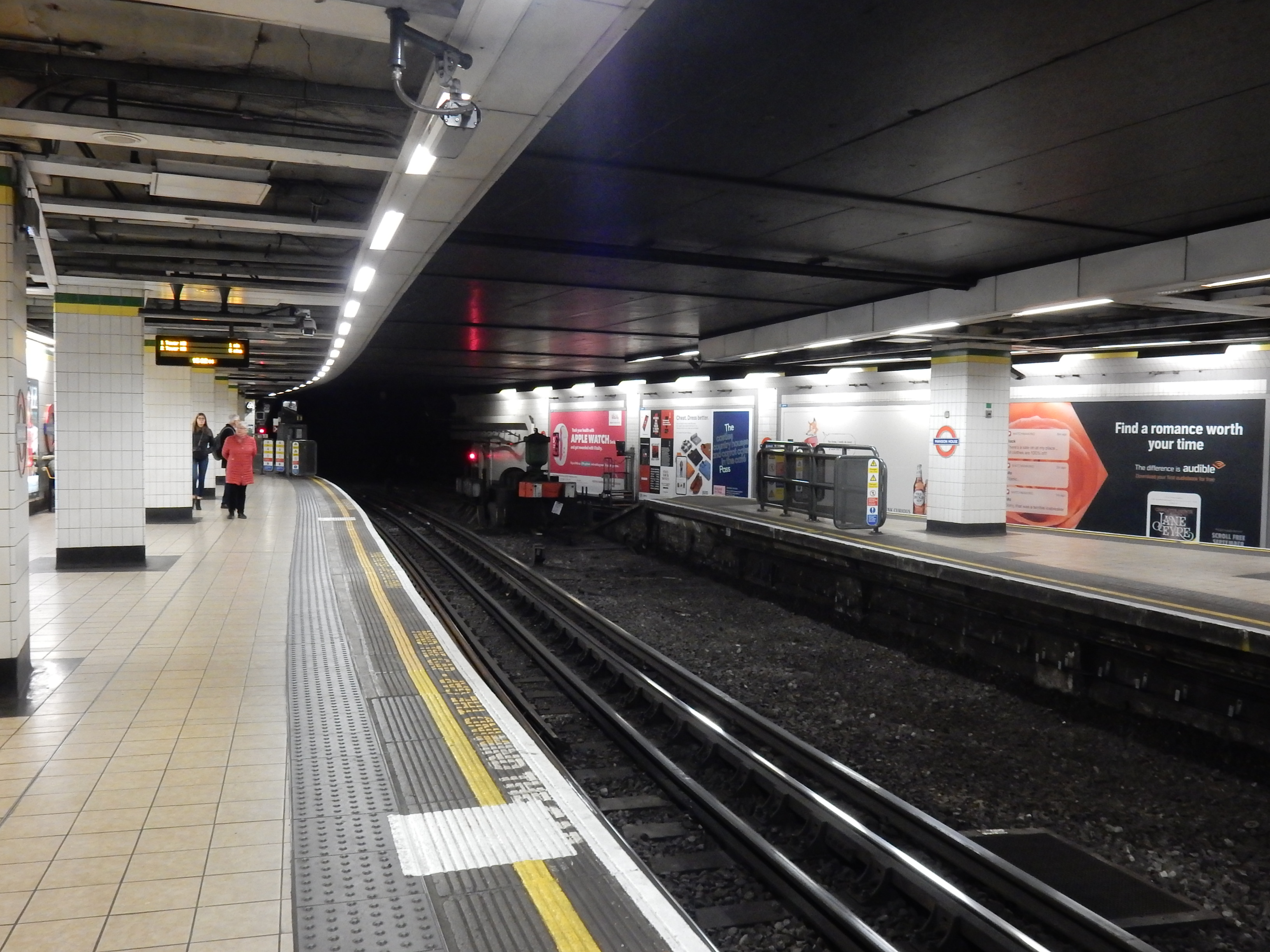
Mansion House station in 2019, showing the buffers still in place on platform 2, but with tracks removed.

London Buses day and night-time routes serve the station.

Preceding station	London Underground	Following station
Blackfriars towards Edgware Road via Victoria	Circle line	Cannon Street towards Hammersmith via Tower Hill
Blackfriars towards Wimbledon, Richmond or Ealing Broadway	District line	Cannon Street towards Upminster
Abandoned plan
Charing Cross towards Wimbledon, Richmond, Ealing Broadway or Hounslow West	District line Deep-level route (1898–1908)	Terminus
