= South Kensington tube station =

London Underground station

South Kensington
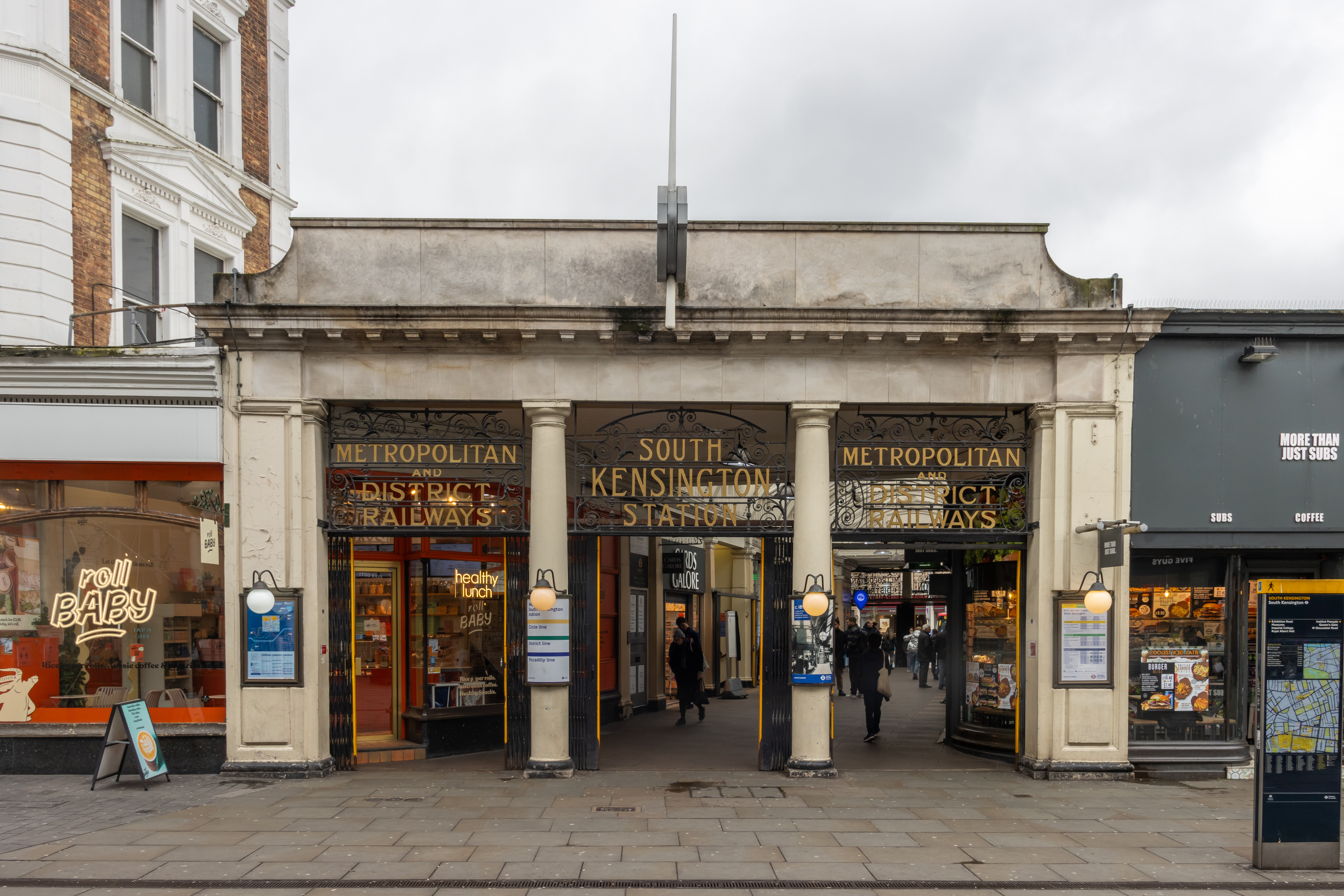
- Entrance to the Arcades leading to South Kensington station
- Interactive map of South Kensington

General information
- Location: South Kensington
- Local authority: Royal Borough of Kensington and Chelsea
- Managed by: London Underground
- Number of platforms: 4
- Fare zone: 1

London Underground annual entry and exit
- 2020: ▼9.81 million
- 2021: ▲10.82 million
- 2022: ▲24.33 million
- 2023: ▲26.09 million
- 2024: ▲29.48 million

Key dates
- 1 October 1868: Opened (MR)
- 24 December 1868: Started (DR)
- 1 February 1872: Started "Outer Circle" (NLR)
- 1 August 1872: Started "Middle Circle" (H&CR/DR)
- 30 June 1900: Ended "Middle Circle"
- 15 December 1906: Opened (GNP&BR)
- 31 December 1908: Ended "Outer Circle"
- 1949: Started (Circle line)

Listed status
- Listing grade: II
- Entry number: 1392067
- Added to list: 27 August 2004

Other information
- External links: TfL station info page
- Coordinates: 51.4941°N 0.1738°W

South Kensington is a London Underground station in the district of South Kensington, London. It is served by three lines: Circle, District and Piccadilly. On the Circle and District lines the station is between Gloucester Road and Sloane Square stations, and on the Piccadilly line it is between Gloucester Road and Knightsbridge stations. The station is in London fare zone 1. The main station entrance is located at the junction of Old Brompton Road (A3218), Thurloe Place, Harrington Road, Onslow Place and Pelham Street. Subsidiary entrances are located in Exhibition Road giving access by pedestrian tunnel to the Natural History, Science and Victoria and Albert Museums. Also close by are the Royal Albert Hall, Imperial College London, the Royal College of Music, the London branch of the Goethe-Institut and the Ismaili Centre.

The station is in two parts: sub-surface platforms opened in 1868 by the Metropolitan Railway and the District Railway as part of the companies' extension of the Inner Circle route eastwards from Gloucester Road to Westminster and deep level platforms opened in 1906 by the Great Northern, Piccadilly and Brompton Railway. A variety of underground and main line services have operated over the sub-surface tracks, which have been modified several times to suit operational demands with the current arrangement being achieved in the 1960s. The deep-level platforms have remained largely unaltered, although the installation of escalators in the 1970s to replace lifts improved interchanges between the two parts of the station. Parts of the sub-surface station and the Exhibition Road pedestrian tunnel are Grade II listed.

South Kensington is the busiest station on the Underground without step-free access, and work to upgrade the station in combination with property development by Places for London is due to begin in 2026.

== History ==
=== Sub-surface station ===
The station was opened on 24 December 1868 by the Metropolitan Railway (MR, later the Metropolitan line) and the District Railway (DR, later the District line). The MR had previously opened an extension from Paddington (Praed Street) (now Paddington) to Gloucester Road on 1 October 1868 and opened tracks to South Kensington to connect to the DR when the DR opened the first section of its line to Westminster. The original South Kensington station, designed by the MR's engineer John Fowler, had two platforms although it was intended that this would be supplemented as DR services extended.

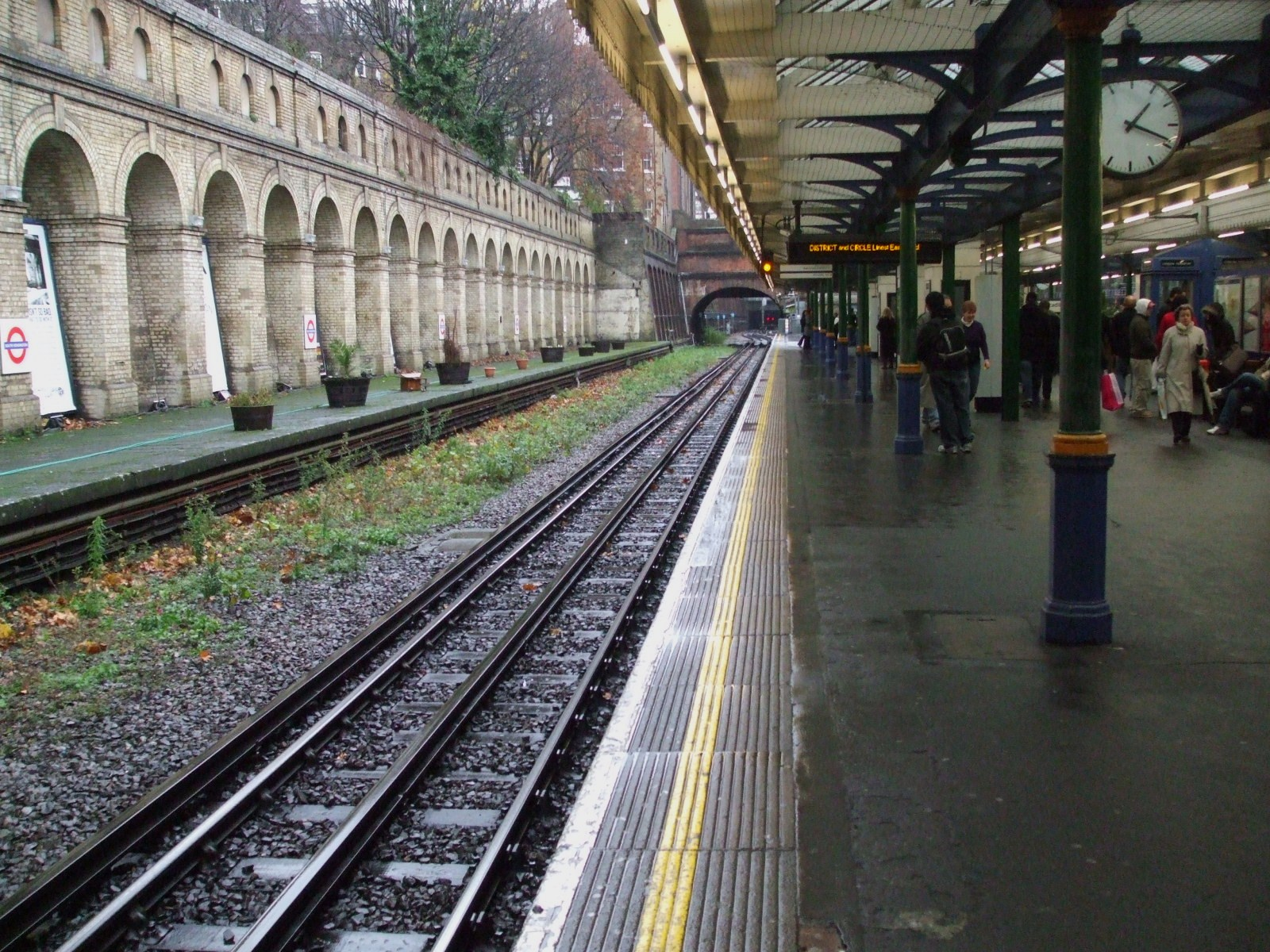
Platform 2 eastbound District and Circle line with disused platform visible on left

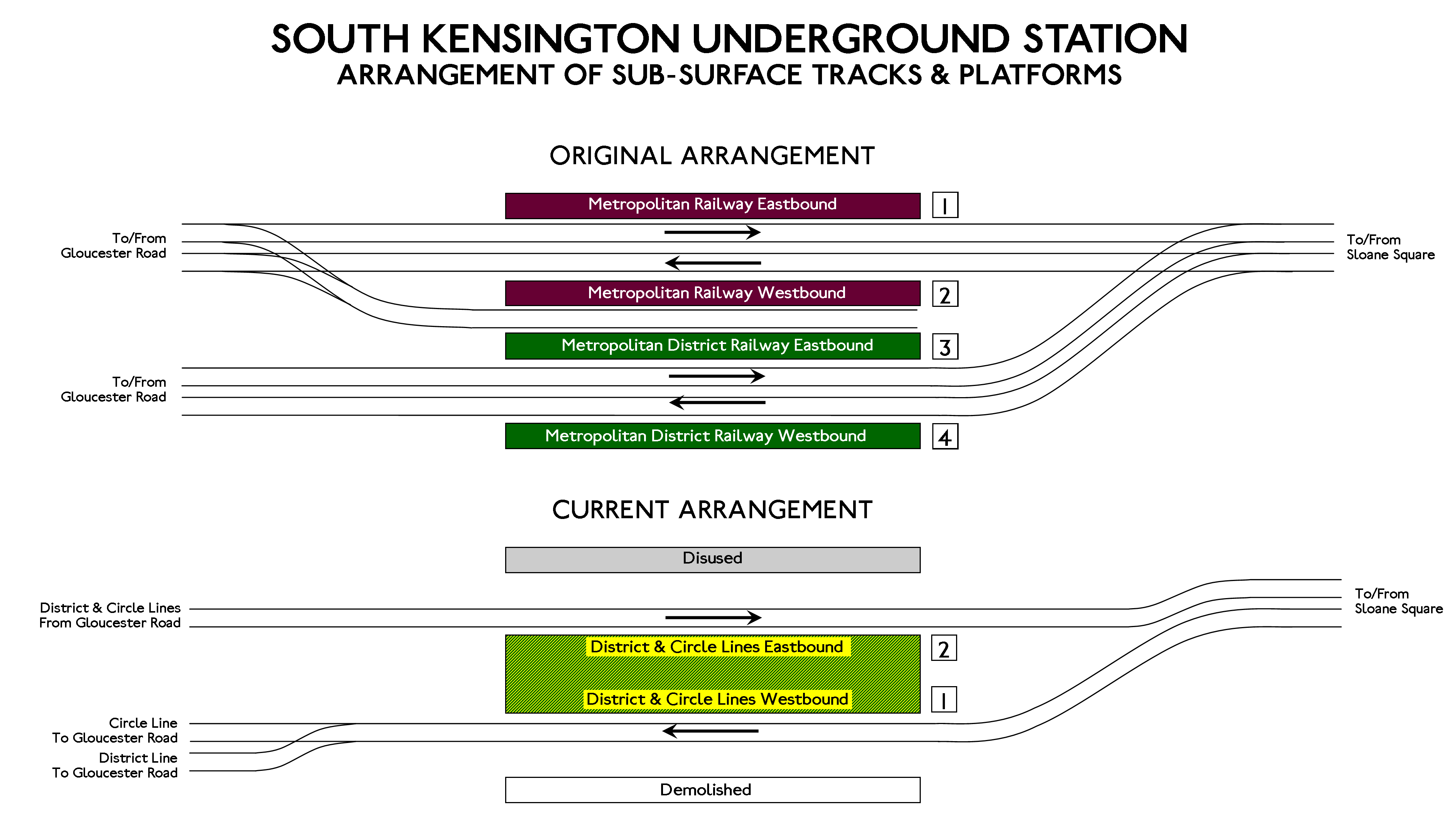
Original and current layout of platforms

On 1 August 1870, the DR opened additional tracks between Gloucester Road and South Kensington. On 10 July 1871, the DR opened its own facilities at South Kensington. The enlarged station had two through platforms for each company and a bay platform for terminating MR trains from the west. The junction between the two companies' tracks was also moved from the west side of the station to the east side.

On 1 February 1872, the DR opened a northbound branch from its station at Earl's Court to connect to the West London Extension Joint Railway (WLEJR, now the West London Line) at Addison Road (now Kensington (Olympia)). From that date the Outer Circle service began running over the DR's tracks. The service was run by the North London Railway (NLR) from its terminus at Broad Street (now demolished) in the City of London via the North London Line to Willesden Junction, then the West London Line to Addison Road and the DR to Mansion House – at that time the eastern terminus of the DR.

From 1 August 1872, the Middle Circle service also began operations through South Kensington, running from Moorgate along the MR's tracks on the north side of the Inner Circle to Paddington, then over the Hammersmith & City Railway (H&CR) track to Latimer Road, then, via a now demolished link, on the WLEJR to Addison Road and the DR to Mansion House. The service was operated jointly by the H&CR and the DR.

On 4 May 1885, the District Railway opened South Kensington Subway, a pedestrian subway (a tiled tunnel), running from the station beneath the length of Exhibition Road, giving sheltered access to the newly built museums for a toll of 1 penny. The subway was originally intended to go as far as the Royal Albert Hall, but the construction of the Imperial Institute meant the tunnel emerged at the Science Museum where it exits onto Exhibition Road. Although it had cost £42,614 to construct (approximately £4.73 million today), it was closed on 10 November 1886 and afterwards was opened only occasionally for special museum events. Originally only opened during exhibitions in South Kensington, it was opened to the public free of charge in 1908. The subway is Grade II listed.

In 1890, the South Kensington and Paddington Subway (SK&PS), a proposed cut-and-cover railway planned to run from South Kensington to Paddington station, offered to purchase the under-used pedestrian subway for use as the first section of its tunnel. At 18 feet (5.5 m) wide and 11 feet (3.4 m) high the subway could have accommodated two tracks without difficulty, but the SK&PS's controversial plan to excavate a trench across Hyde Park was opposed and the railway withdrew its private bill from Parliament in March 1891. The DR continued to open the subway intermittently and charged a toll until 1908, when it was opened permanently for free. On 30 June 1900, the Middle Circle service was withdrawn between Earl's Court and Mansion House, and, on 31 December 1908, the Outer Circle service was also shortened to terminate at Earl's Court. In 1907, the station reopened to designs by George Campbell Sherrin, including a new art deco entrance with an arcade and a new ticket hall, with canopies added to the platforms replacing the two trainsheds erected in 1868 and 1871.

In 1949, the Metropolitan line-operated Inner Circle route was given its own identity on the tube map as the Circle line. In June 1957, the reversing bay track was taken out of use and the track bed was later filled to connect the two island platforms. The eastbound MR platform (Number 1) and westbound DR platform (Number 4) were taken out of use in January 1966 and March 1969 respectively. The tracks for these platforms were also removed and platform 4 was subsequently demolished in the early 1970s to allow escalators to be provided to the Piccadilly line. The widened island platform is now served by the District and Circle lines in both directions. Following the closure of platforms 1 and 4, platform 3 was renumbered as 1. The current arrangement has trains running in opposite directions to the original layout. During service disruption or engineering works, trains can also run Eastbound from Platform 1. The arcaded station entrance and shops, the brick retaining walls to the sub-surface platforms and the Exhibition Road pedestrian tunnel are Grade II listed structures.

Over the decades, there were also a number of aborted attempts to build above the station with hotels, offices and a shopping mall proposed at times. None were built.

=== Deep-level station ===
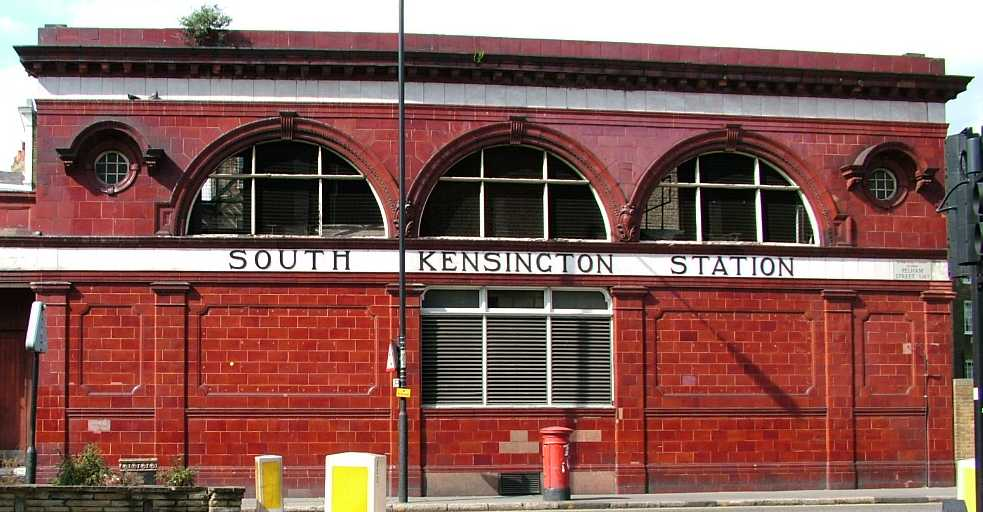
Former Piccadilly line station building

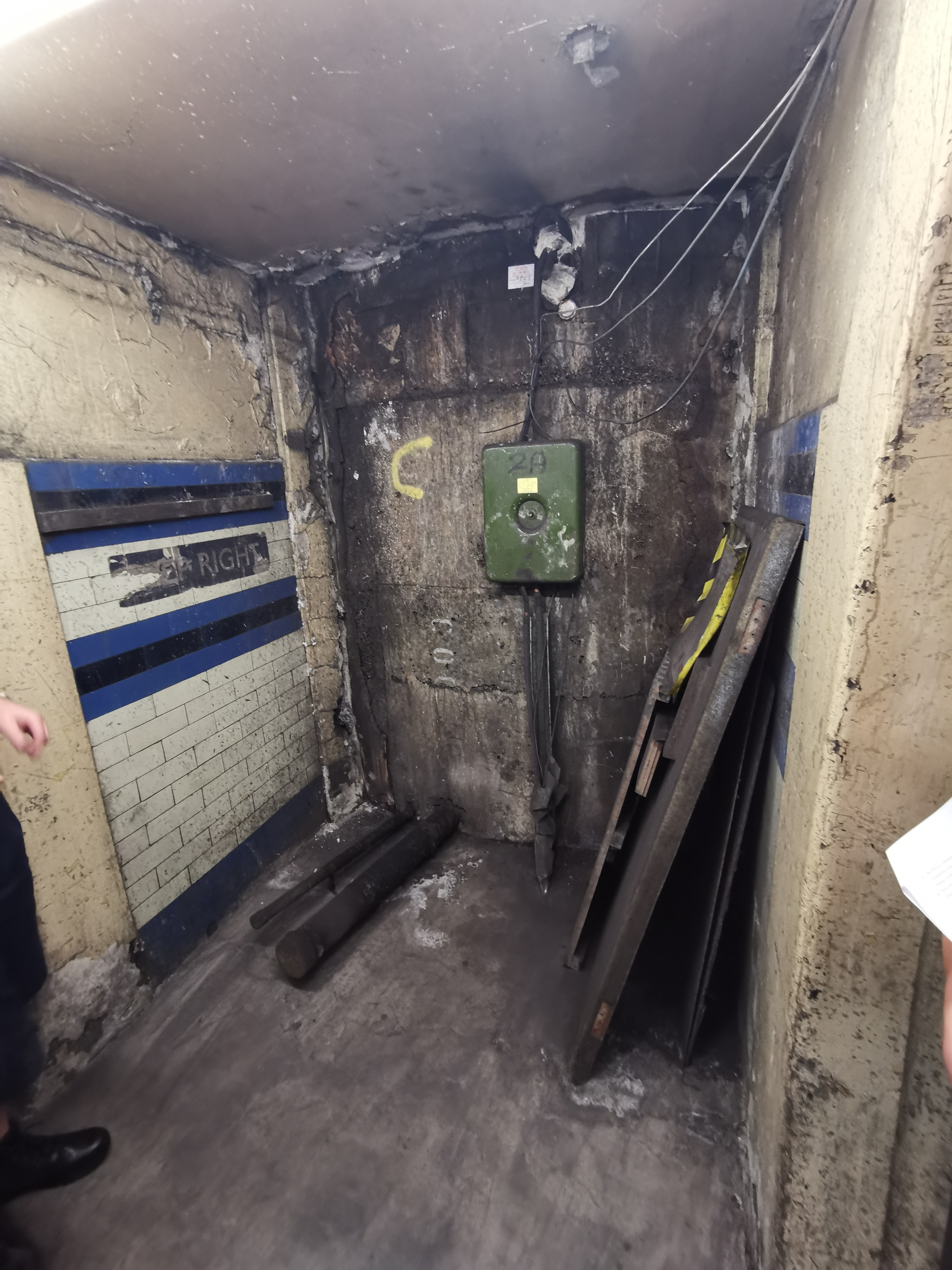
Former lift landing for the deep level station

By the beginning of the 20th century, the DR had been extended to Richmond, Ealing Broadway, Hounslow West and Wimbledon in the west and to New Cross Gate in the east. The southern section of the Inner Circle was suffering considerable congestion between South Kensington and Mansion House, between which stations the DR was running an average of 20 trains per hour with more in the peak periods.

To relieve the congestion, the DR planned an express deep-level tube line starting from a connection to its sub-surface tracks west of Gloucester Road and running to Mansion House. The tunnels were planned to run about 60 to 70 feet (18–21 m) beneath the existing sub-surface route with only one intermediate stop at Charing Cross (now Embankment). Parliamentary approval was obtained in 1897 but no work was done. In 1898, the DR took over the Brompton and Piccadilly Circus Railway (B&PCR) which had a route planned from South Kensington to Piccadilly Circus. The route was modified to join the DR deep-level route at South Kensington.

Following the purchase of the DR by the Underground Electric Railways Company of London in 1902, the planned DR and B&PCR lines were merged with a third proposed route from the Great Northern and Strand Railway. The DR deep-level route was revised at its western end to continue to Earl's Court and surface to the east of Barons Court.

The deep-level platforms were opened on 15 December 1906 by the Great Northern, Piccadilly and Brompton Railway (GNP&BR, now the Piccadilly line) which ran between Finsbury Park and Hammersmith. The platforms are placed eastbound above westbound and were originally served by lifts from street level stopping at both platform levels. Eastbound GNP&BR trains and DR trains would have shared the same platform with the two routes separating at a junction immediately to the east of the station. Westbound trains would have had separate platforms at the lower level with the routes merging at a junction west of the station. Although construction of the section of the DR tube route east of South Kensington had been postponed, a partial, 120-foot (37 m) long, section of the westbound DR platform was built along with the two for GNP&BR use. Though closed-off from the rest of the station, it was linked to the lift lobby and was tiled to match the other platforms. Enlarged tunnel sections for the junctions were constructed with the original running tunnels and remain visible from passing trains. A new surface building on Pelham Street for the lifts was designed by Leslie Green with the GNP&BR's distinctive ox-blood red glazed terracotta façade.

The unused westbound tunnel was used during World War I to store art from the Victoria & Albert Museum and china from Buckingham Palace and, from 1927 to 1939, was used as a signalling school. During World War II it contained equipment to detect bombs falling in the River Thames which might require the emergency floodgates on the under-river tunnels to be closed.

In the early 1970s the lifts to the Piccadilly line platforms were replaced by escalators, with one pair being provided between the ticket hall and a new intermediate level, where it met a linking passageway to the Circle and District line platforms, and three being provided from there to a lower concourse between the levels of the two Piccadilly line platforms. Stairs up and down from the lower concourse connect to the platforms. The stairs and passage to the westbound platform are located in the disused DR westbound platform tunnel. With the introduction of escalators, the GNP&BR station building was taken out of use.

In February 2021, access to the Piccadilly line was closed to replace the escalators. The work was completed by June 2022.

== Property development and station upgrade ==
Many stations on the Circle line which were originally constructed in open cuttings have been subject to air-rights developments where cuttings have been roofed over with buildings built above. (Note: An example of an air rights development is adjacent Gloucester Road station where the Circle and District line platforms were roofed over in the 1990s for the construction of a shopping mall and an apartment building.) South Kensington station and the adjacent shop premises occupy a site of approximately 0.77 hectares (1.9 acres) and proposals for redevelopment of the station and the site have been made a number of times since the 1950s. (Note: Previous redevelopment proposals have been designed by Scott, Brownrigg & Turner (1989), Terry Farrell & Partners (1997 & 2002), Francis Machin (2006) and John McAslan and Partners (2009).)

In December 2016, Transport for London published outline proposals prepared by architects BuckleyGrayYeoman for a redevelopment of the buildings to the west of the station arcade and in Thurloe Street and space to the south of the station cutting on Pelham Street. This would provide new homes, offices and improved retail space. The proposal also included bringing the disused northern platform back into use for eastbound trains, a new entrance to Thurloe Street, a reconfigured ticket hall and provision of step-free access to the District and Circle lines. A planning application to a revised design by architects Rogers Stirk Harbour + Partners was submitted in 2020, but was refused by Kensington and Chelsea Council in November 2021, despite a recommendation for approval by Council officers. On 12 December 2023, the Planning Inspectorate upheld the bulk of an appeal against the refusal of planning consent and the redevelopment can proceed. The development will be a joint venture between Places for London (TfL's property development arm) and Native Land, a property developer.

In March 2026, work would soon begin to upgrade the station and make the Circle and District lines accessible. The project will be funded by £12 million from Places for London, £12 million from Kensington and Chelsea Council and £250,000 from the 1851 Royal Commission. Work is due to be completed by 2029.

== Services ==
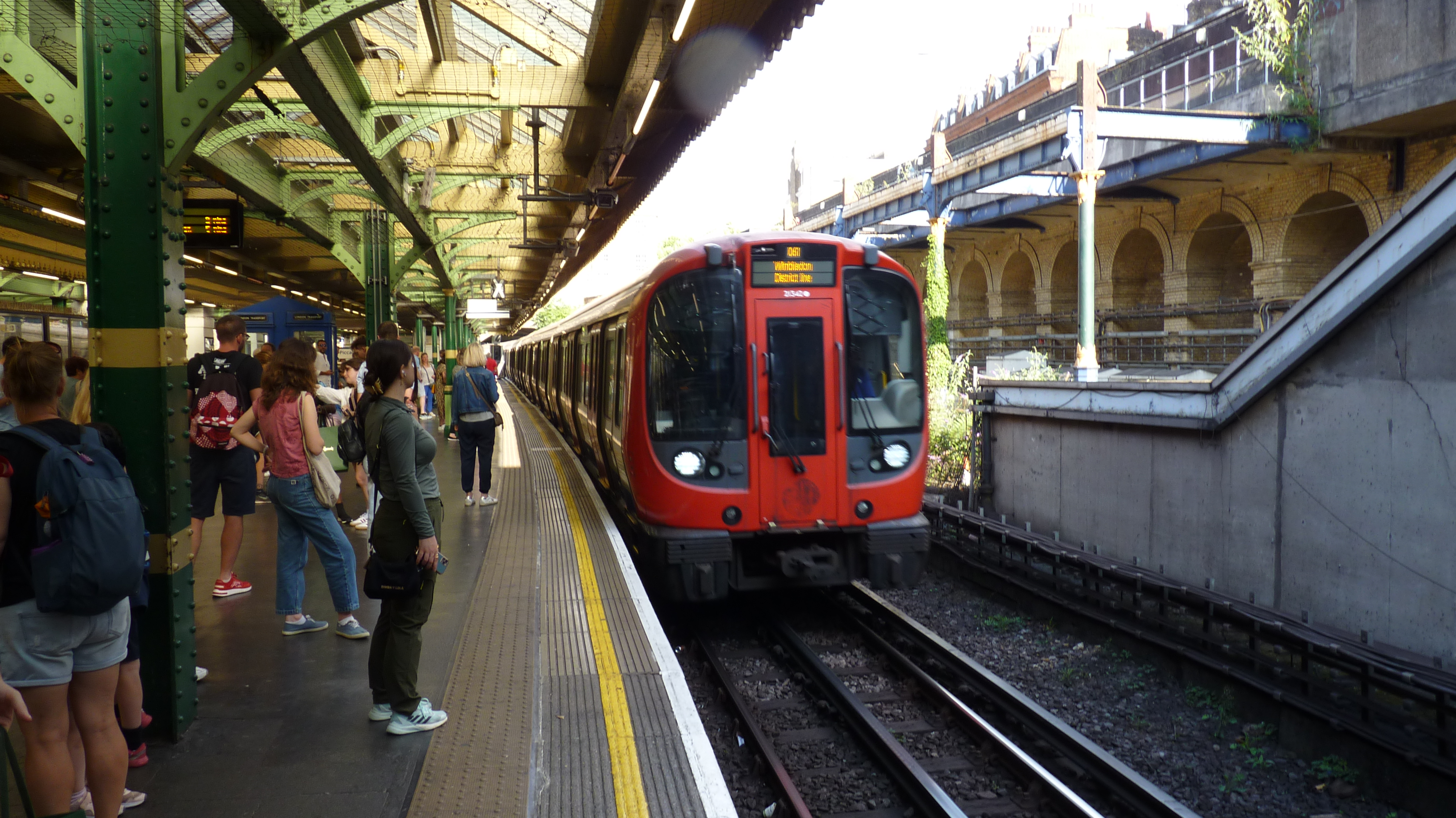
A District line train to Wimbledon arriving at westbound platform 1

South Kensington station is on the Circle, District and Piccadilly lines in London fare zone 1. On the Circle and District lines, the station is between Gloucester Road and Sloane Square. On the Piccadilly line, it is between Gloucester Road and Knightsbridge. South Kensington is the easternmost interchange between these three lines.

Train frequencies vary throughout the day, but generally District line trains operate every 2–6 minutes from approximately 05:15 to 00:30 eastbound and 05:45 to 00:45 westbound; they are supplemented by Circle line trains every 8–12 minutes from approximately 05:30 to 00:30 clockwise and 05:40 to 00:15 anticlockwise. Piccadilly line trains operate every 2–6 minutes from approximately 05:40 to 00:25 eastbound and 05:50 to 00:40 westbound.

On the Circle and District lines, the S Stock is used. On the Piccadilly line, the 1973 Stock is used.

Preceding station	London Underground	Following station
Gloucester Road towards Edgware Road	Circle line	Sloane Square towards Hammersmith via Tower Hill
Gloucester Road towards Wimbledon, Richmond or Ealing Broadway	District line	Sloane Square towards Upminster
Gloucester Road towards Uxbridge, Rayners Lane or Heathrow Airport (Terminal 4 or Terminal 5)	Piccadilly line	Knightsbridge towards Cockfosters or Arnos Grove
Former routing
Preceding station	London Underground	Following station
Gloucester Road towards Uxbridge or Hounslow West	Piccadilly line Former route (1906–1934)	Brompton Road towards Cockfosters or Arnos Grove
Abandoned plan
Gloucester Road towards Wimbledon, Richmond or Ealing Broadway	District line Deep Old	Charing Cross towards Upminster, High Street Kensington or Edgware Road

== Connections ==
Various day and nighttime London Buses routes serve the station. There is a Santander Cycles rental station north of the station in Thurlow Street.

== In literature ==
South Kensington is one of two tube stations (the other being Sloane Square) mentioned in the song "When you're lying awake" from the operetta Iolanthe by Gilbert and Sullivan.

== Notes and references ==
=== Bibliography ===
- Badsey-Ellis, Antony (2005). London's Lost Tube Schemes. Capital Transport. ISBN 1-85414-293-3.
- Deloitte (2016). South Kensington Station Around Station Development: Development Brief (PDF).
- Horne, Mike (2006). The District Line. Capital Transport. ISBN 1-85414-292-5.
- John McAslan & Partners (2009). South Kensington Underground Station: Massing & Feasibility Study (part 1) (PDF). Transport for London. Archived from the original (PDF) on 28 December 2009.
- John McAslan & Partners (2009). South Kensington Underground Station: Massing & Feasibility Study (part 2) (PDF). Transport for London.
- John McAslan & Partners (2009). South Kensington Underground Station: Massing & Feasibility Study (part 3) (PDF). Transport for London.
- John McAslan & Partners (2009). South Kensington Underground Station: Massing & Feasibility Study (part 4) (PDF). Transport for London.
- Rose, Douglas (1999) [1980]. The London Underground, A Diagrammatic History. Douglas Rose/Capital Transport. ISBN 1-85414-219-4.
- Wolmar, Christian (2005) [2004]. The Subterranean Railway: How the London Underground Was Built and How It Changed the City Forever. Atlantic Books. ISBN 1-84354-023-1.
