= The Goodsyard =

- The designs, shown above, are being revised and released in 2017
- Interactive map of the The Goodsyard area

General information
- Status: Approved
- Type: Mixed use
- Location: Shoreditch, London, United Kingdom
- Coordinates: 51.522893°N 0.075718°W
- Cost: £900m
- Client: Hammerson/Ballymore

Height
- Height: Up to 166 m (545 ft) ft

Technical details
- Floor count: Up to 46

Design and construction
- Architecture firm: PLP, FaulknerBrowns, BuckleyGrayYeoman

Website
- http://www.thegoodsyardlondon.co.uk

The Goodsyard is a proposed development on the site of the former Bishopsgate Goods Yard in Shoreditch, London. It spans the border between the two London boroughs of Hackney and Tower Hamlets. The scheme, which is a joint venture between developers Hammerson and Ballymore, previously included 12 buildings, the tallest of which was planned to be 166-metre (545 ft) tall with 46 floors. In total, 1,356 homes were proposed, as well as offices, retail and workshop space and a 0.97-hectare (2.4-acre) park.

In 2015, the then London Mayor Boris Johnson called in the scheme, which gave him the authority to grant or reject planning permission. A decision was due in April 2016 but was delayed, before the plans were withdrawn in April 2016 following concerns by Greater London Authority (GLA) that the proposals did not provide enough affordable housing and the buildings could block out light to the surrounding area. In July 2016 the developers announced that the plans will be redesigned over the next year.

The proposed development has received opposition from heritage bodies and local residents. It is also opposed by Hackney and Tower Hamlets Borough Councils.

== Planning ==
Developers Hammerson and Ballymore acquired the site of the former Bishopsgate Goods Yard, which has been derelict for 50 years, from Network Rail in 2002 and began working on development plans. The developers submitted a planning application in July 2014 for plans that included four towers of 30, 34, 42 and 49 storeys and a total of 1,500 homes, 19,000 square metres (200,000 sq ft) of retail space, 60,000 m^{2} (650,000 sq ft) of office space as well as workshops.

=== Revised plans ===
Following a consultation process, the developers submitted amended plans on 15 June 2015. The revised plans saw a reduction in the height of the towers to 26, 30, 38 and 46 storeys, with the tallest tower planned to be 166-metre (545 ft) tall. The new proposals included 1,356 homes with 15.8 per cent classed as affordable, 78,000 m^{2} (840,000 sq ft) of office space as well as 19,000 m^{2} (200,000 sq ft) of retail and restaurant space. In total, 12 buildings were planned for construction.

The two councils on whose land the site is located both oppose the development and were also unable to agree what should be built on the site, with Hackney Council wanting to focus on job opportunities and Tower Hamlets wanting large family homes. In 2015, the then London Mayor, Boris Johnson, controversially called in the scheme upon request from the developers, using a rule that lets the Mayor of London intervene in borough planning if planning decisions have not been made within 16 weeks of an application being submitted. This gave Johnson the authority to make the final decision on planning permission. The decision was due on 11 April 2016, with the Mayor's planning officers at Greater London Authority advising him to reject the proposals as they considered the scale of development inappropriate. However, the decision was delayed.

In April 2016, the revised plans were withdrawn after Greater London Authority raised concerns over a lack of affordable housing allocation and that the buildings could block sunlight to the surrounding area. The developers announced in July 2016 that the revised proposal will be further redesigned, which will take up to a year to complete.

As well as being opposed by Hackney and Tower Hamlets councils, the plans have received opposition from local residents and heritage bodies including The Victorian Society, The East End Preservation Society and the Spitalfields Society. It has been described by The Guardian as "one of the most fiercely opposed developments in recent history". Opponents argue the scheme will impact on the character of the area, lacks sufficient affordable housing and the taller towers will block out sunlight from the surrounding area. A campaign group called More Light More Power was created, arguing that the current proposals would "mean less sunlight across a very wide area especially in winter months".

A petition opposing to the development had gained 11,000 signatures as of April 2016.

A revised application was submitted to the GLA in October 2019. Johnson's successor as Mayor, Sadiq Khan, was due to decide whether the proposal will go forward at a hearing on 3 December 2020, which was then given the go ahead.

== See also ==
- List of tallest buildings and structures in London
- List of tallest buildings in the United Kingdom
