= Tower of London tube station =

Former London Underground station

Tower of London
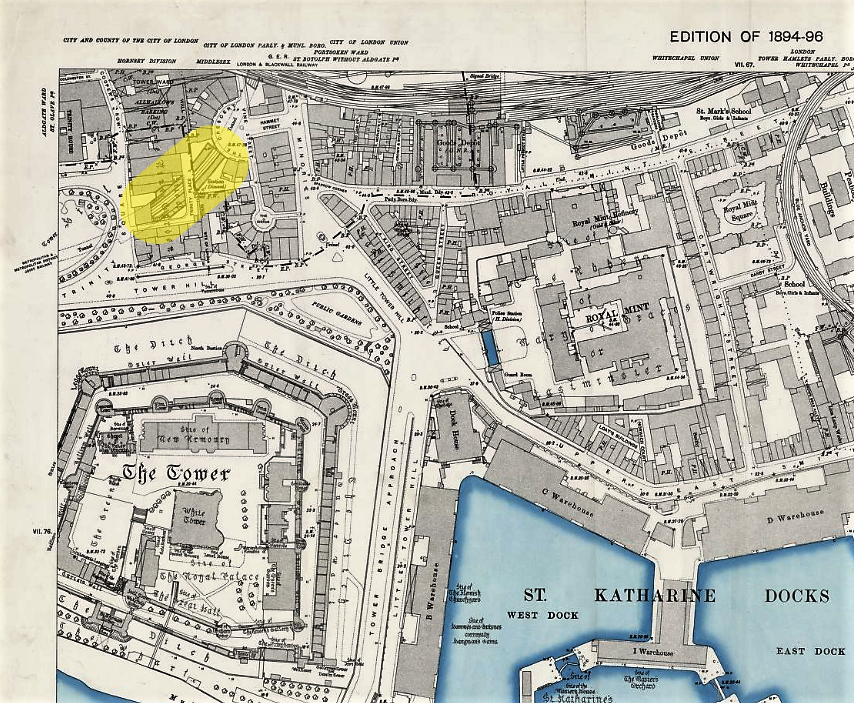
- Disused Tower of London station highlighted on an 1896 map

General information
- Location: Tower Hill
- Coordinates: 51°30′36″N 0°04′36″W
- Owner: Metropolitan Railway
- Platforms: 2

Other information
- Status: Disused

Key dates
- 25 September 1882: Opened
- 13 October 1884: Closed
Location
- Interactive map of the location

Tower of London was a London Underground station in Tower Hill that was opened by the Metropolitan Railway on 25 September 1882 and closed on 13 October 1884, only two years after opening. It was the temporary terminus of a short extension south from Aldgate that was purchased, without the station, and incorporated into the Metropolitan and Metropolitan District Joint Railway in 1884. It was situated near the Tower of London, on a site now occupied by Tower Hill station.

== History ==
The station was opened on 25 September 1882. It was the temporary terminus of a short extension of the Metropolitan Railway (the Met) from Aldgate to Trinity Square. The extension was built by Thomas A. Walker with work commencing on 5 September 1881. During the work at the station site, a section of the Roman London Wall was uncovered and some wooden pipes laid by the New River Company. The station was a quickly constructed wooden building with an ornamental iron roof. It had two side platforms of 300 feet (91 m). The powers (Note: The Metropolitan Railway Act 1881) under which the extension was built required the District Railway (DR) to agree with the Met on the location of stations, but there is no evidence this happened for Tower of London. The DR was already planning for a station just 200 yards (180 m) to the west.

On 6 October 1884 the Metropolitan and Metropolitan District Joint Railway (also known as the City Lines) was opened to connect the eastern end of the DR at Mansion House to the Met at Aldgate and completed the Circle line. (Note: Authorised as the Metropolitan and District (City Lines and Extensions) Railway.) The already-built Met line between Aldgate and Tower of London was purchased by the City Lines joint committee, but the Tower of London station remained with the Met. The DR refused to sell tickets to the station and it closed on 13 October 1884. A new joint DR/Met station was built to the west and opened on 6 October 1884 with the name Mark Lane. It was renamed Tower Hill in 1946. The wooden surface building of the Tower of London station remained until August 1940. When Tower Hill station was closed and relocated in 1967, the new station was opened on the former site of the Tower of London station.

== Notes ==
Preceding station	London Underground	Following station
Terminus	Metropolitan Railway (1882-1884)	Aldgate towards Baker Street
