= Embankment tube station =

London Underground station

Embankment
- Entrance to Villiers Street
- Interactive map of Embankment

General information
- Location: Victoria Embankment / Charing Cross
- Local authority: City of Westminster
- Managed by: London Underground
- Number of platforms: 6
- Fare zone: 1
- OSI: Charing Cross; Waterloo East; Waterloo

London Underground annual entry and exit
- 2021: ▲8.25 million
- 2022: ▲15.13 million
- 2023: ▲17.05 million
- 2024: ▲17.22 million
- 2025: ▲17.94 million

Key dates
- 30 May 1870: Opened (DR)
- 1 February 1872: Started "Outer Circle" (NLR)
- 1 August 1872: Started "Middle Circle" (H&CR/DR)
- 30 June 1900: Ended "Middle Circle"
- 10 March 1906: Opened (BS&WR)
- 31 December 1908: Ended "Outer Circle"
- 6 April 1914: Opened (CCE&HR)
- 13 September 1926: Extended (Northern line)
- 1949: Started (Circle line)

Other information
- External links: TfL station info page
- Coordinates: 51.507°N 0.122°W

Embankment is a London Underground station in the City of Westminster, known by various names during its history. It is served by four lines: Bakerloo, Circle, District and Northern. On the Bakerloo line and the Charing Cross branch of the Northern line, the station is between Charing Cross and Waterloo stations. On the Circle and District lines, it is between Westminster and Temple stations. It is in London fare zone 1. The station has two entrances, one on Victoria Embankment and the other on Villiers Street. The station is adjacent to Victoria Embankment Gardens and is close to Charing Cross station, Embankment Pier, Hungerford Bridge, Cleopatra's Needle, the Royal Air Force Memorial, the Savoy Chapel and Savoy Hotel and the Playhouse and New Players Theatres.

The station is in two parts: sub-surface platforms opened on 30 May 1870 by the District Railway (DR) as part of the company's extension of the Inner Circle eastwards from Westminster to Blackfriars and deep-level platforms opened in 1906 by the Baker Street and Waterloo Railway (BS&WR) and 6 April 1914 by the Charing Cross, Euston and Hampstead Railway (CCE&HR). A variety of underground and main line services have operated over the sub-surface tracks and the CCE&HR part of the station was reconstructed in the 1920s.

== History ==
=== Sub-surface station ===
The station was opened on 30 May 1870 by the DR (now the District line) when the railway extended its line from Westminster to Blackfriars. The construction of the new section of the DR was planned in conjunction with the building of the Victoria Embankment and was achieved by the cut and cover method of roofing over a trench. Due to its proximity to the South Eastern Railway's Charing Cross station, the station was originally called Charing Cross.

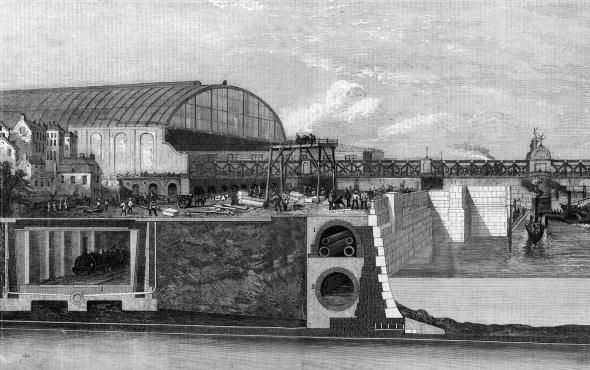
Section through Victoria Embankment at Charing Cross showing sub-surface railway

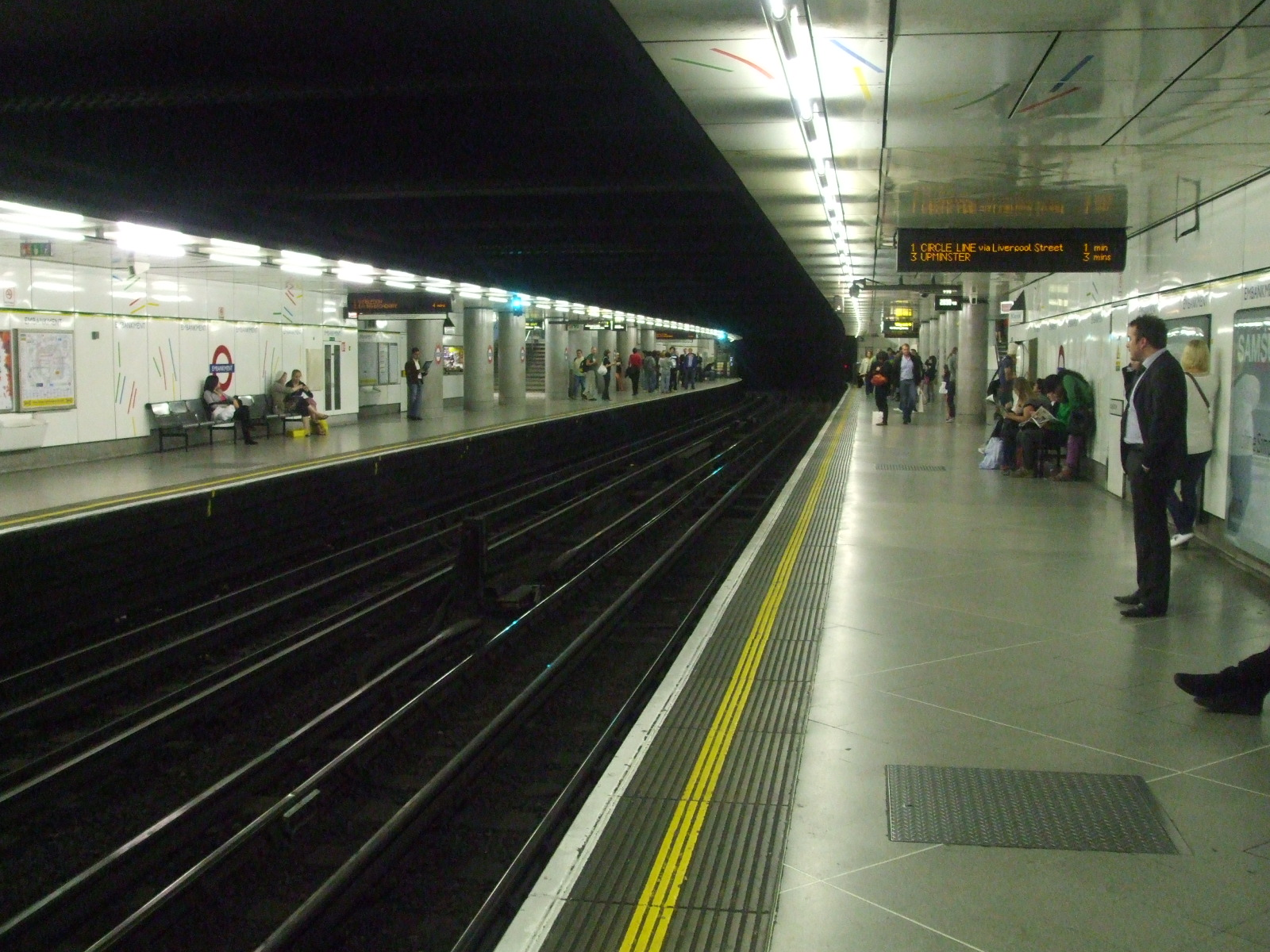
Sub-surface platforms at Embankment station looking west

The DR connected to the MR (now the Metropolitan line) at South Kensington and, although the two companies were rivals, each company operated its trains over the other's tracks in a joint service known as the Inner Circle. On 1 February 1872, the DR opened a northbound branch from its station at Earl's Court to connect to the West London Extension Joint Railway (WLEJR, now the West London Line) at Addison Road (now Kensington (Olympia)). From that date the Outer Circle service began running over the DR's tracks. The service was run by the North London Railway (NLR) from its terminus at Broad Street (now demolished) in the City of London via the North London Line to Willesden Junction, then the West London Line to Addison Road and the DR to Mansion House – at that time the eastern terminus of the DR.

From 1 August 1872, the Middle Circle service also began operations through South Kensington, running from Moorgate along the MR's tracks on the north side of the Inner Circle to Paddington, then over the Hammersmith & City Railway (H&CR) track to Latimer Road, then, via a now demolished link, on the WLEJR to Addison Road and the DR to Mansion House. The service was operated jointly by the H&CR and the DR.

On 30 June 1900, the Middle Circle service was shortened to terminate at Earl's Court, and, on 31 December 1908, the Outer Circle service was withdrawn from the DR tracks. In 1949, the Metropolitan line-operated Inner Circle route was given its own identity on the tube map as the Circle line.

=== Deep-level station ===
In 1897 the DR obtained parliamentary permission to construct a deep-level tube railway running between Gloucester Road and Mansion House beneath the sub-surface line. The new line was to be an express route using electric trains to relieve congestion on the sub-surface tracks. Only one intermediate station was planned, at Charing Cross, 63 feet (19 m) below the sub-surface platforms. No immediate work was carried out on the deep-level line, and the subsequent take over of the DR by the Underground Electric Railways Company of London (UERL) and the resignalling and electrification of the DR's routes between 1903 and 1905 meant that congestion was relieved without needing to construct the deep-level line. The plan was dropped in 1908.

On 10 March 1906, the BS&WR (now the Bakerloo line) opened with its deep-level platforms beneath and at ninety degrees to the platforms of the DR. Although an interchange was provided between the two separate railways, the BS&WR named its station differently as Embankment.

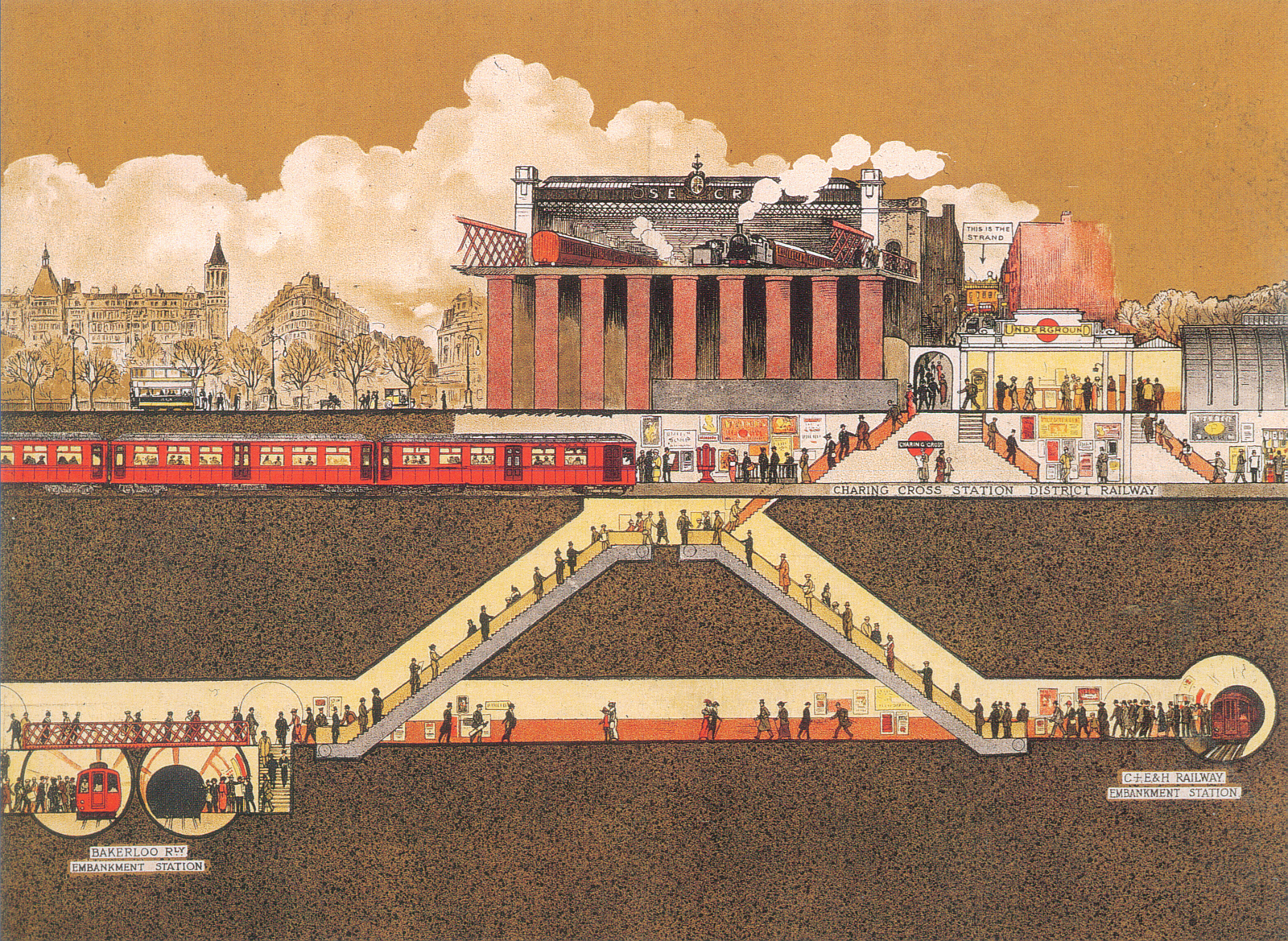
Section through station showing the layout in 1914

On 6 April 1914, the CCE&HR (now a part of the Northern line) opened a one stop extension south from its terminus at Charing Cross. The extension was constructed to facilitate a better interchange between the BS&WR and CCE&HR. Both lines were owned by the UERL which operated two separate and unconnected stations at the northern end of main line station – Trafalgar Square on the BS&WR and Charing Cross on the CCE&HR (both now part of a combined Charing Cross station). The CCE&HR extension was constructed as a single track tunnel running south from Charing Cross as a loop under the River Thames and back. A single platform was constructed on the northbound return section of the loop, and escalators were installed between both sets of deep-level platforms and the sub-surface station. The interchange time was reduced from three minutes fifteen seconds to one minute and forty-five seconds.

A new station building was constructed that Sir John Betjeman described as "the most charming of all the Edwardian and neo-Georgian Renaissance stations." For the opening of the CCE&HR extension, the deep-level parts of the station were named Charing Cross (Embankment) although the sub-surface platforms remained as Charing Cross. In 1915, this was rectified by changing the name of the whole station to Charing Cross. The CCE&HR station to the north was renamed Strand at the same time (causing a nearby station of the GNP&BR to change its name from Strand to Aldwych).

In the 1920s, as part of the construction of what is now the Northern line, the CCE&HR was extended south to Waterloo and Kennington where it was connected to the City & South London Railway. The loop tunnel under the river was abandoned (although the present northbound Northern line platform follows its course) and two new tunnels were bored south. To this day the southbound Northern line platform is the only one of the four deep level platforms that is not connected to any of the others by deep level walkways, being accessible only from the "mid concourse level". The new extension was opened on 13 September 1926.

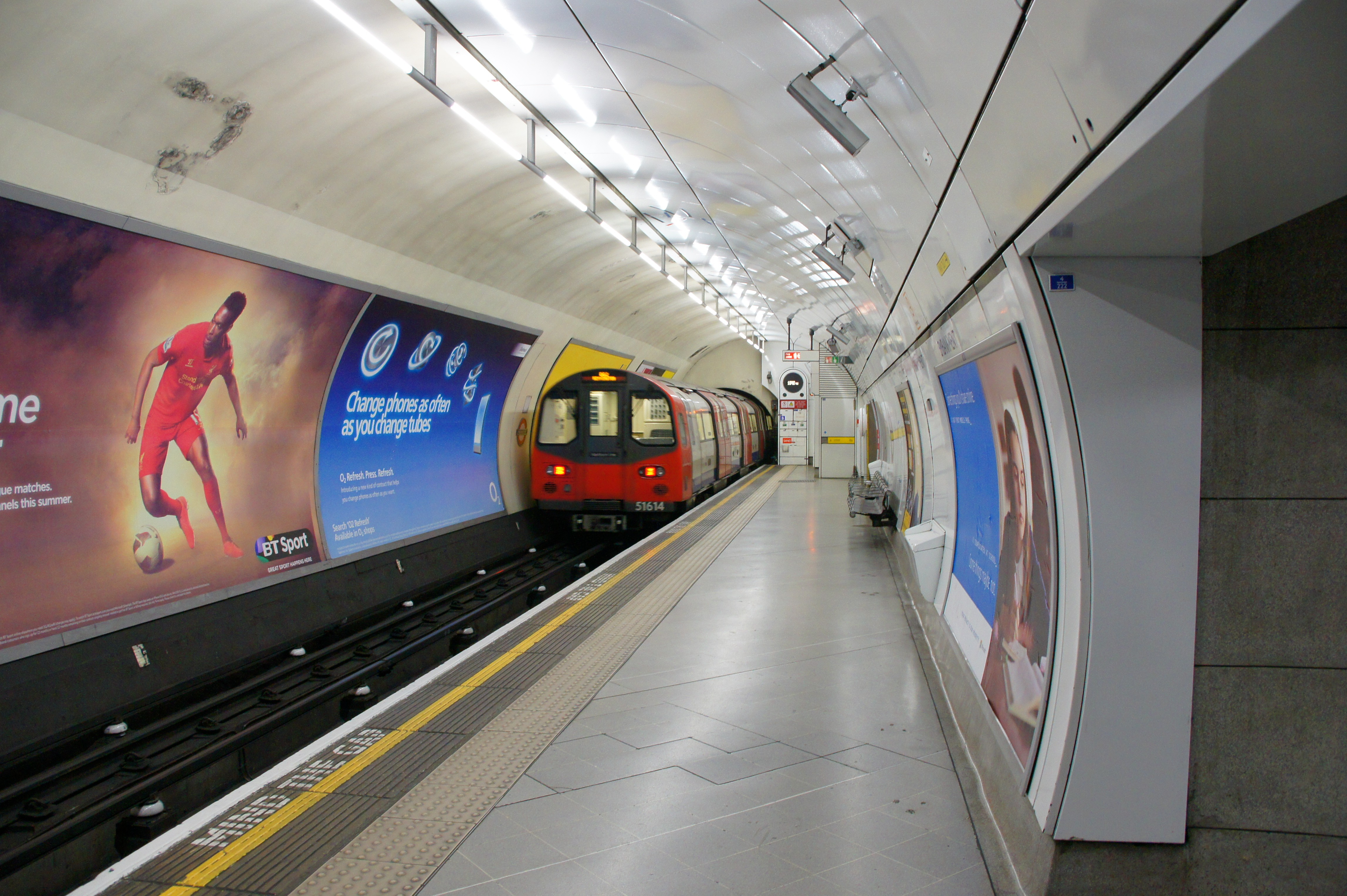
The Northern line southbound platform

The loop itself still exists, although it was penetrated by a bomb and flooded during the Blitz in the Second World War. The loop had been sealed off years before. In September 1938, during the Sudeten Crisis, when war appeared imminent, the Bakerloo and Northern line tunnels at Embankment were temporarily sealed with concrete to protect against flooding through bombing. The blockage was removed after little more than a week once the crisis had passed. At the outbreak of World War II in September 1939, the tunnels were blocked again until electrically powered emergency doors could be installed in the tunnel mouths. The tunnels reopened in December 1939.

On 4 August 1974, the station was once again renamed Charing Cross Embankment. Then, on 12 September 1976, it became Embankment, so that the merged Strand and Trafalgar Square stations could be named Charing Cross.

In 1984–5 the station was upgraded, and public art in the form of coloured lines, by the artist Robyn Denny, were installed on the platforms and passageways of the station.

From January until November 2014, access to the Bakerloo and Northern Line was closed whilst the replacement of the 80-year-old escalators took place

Embankment's northbound Northern line platform remains the only place on the network where Oswald Laurence's 'Mind the gap' announcement can still be heard, having been reinstated in 2013 at the request of Laurence's widow.

=== Fatal accident ===
At about 09:55 on 17 May 1938, an eastbound Inner Circle train collided with an eastbound Ealing Broadway–Barking District line train to the east of the station. The Barking train had been stopped at an automatic signal on its way to Temple station. Six passengers were killed and 43 injured. The cause of the accident was a faulty signal, which showed a green "proceed" aspect to the second train even though the line ahead was not clear. This was a result of a wrong connection made during the previous night when some minor alterations to wiring were made.

== Services and layout ==
Embankment station is on the Bakerloo, Circle, District and Northern lines in London fare zone 1. On the Circle and District lines, the station is between Westminster and Temple. On the Bakerloo line and the Charing Cross branch of the Northern line, it is between Charing Cross and Waterloo. The Circle and District lines share the same platforms at Embankment, but the Bakerloo and Northern lines each have their own platforms.

Preceding station	London Underground	Following station
Charing Cross towards Harrow & Wealdstone	Bakerloo line	Waterloo towards Elephant & Castle
Charing Cross towards Edgware, Mill Hill East or High Barnet	Northern line Charing Cross branch	Waterloo towards Battersea Power Station, Morden or Kennington
Westminster towards Edgware Road via Victoria	Circle line	Temple towards Hammersmith via Tower Hill
Westminster towards Wimbledon, Richmond or Ealing Broadway	District line	Temple towards Upminster
Abandoned plan
South Kensington towards Wimbledon, Richmond, Ealing Broadway or Hounslow West	District line Deep-level route (1898–1908)	Mansion House Terminus

== Station plans ==
Plans of the station, designed by Harry Wharton Ford (1875–1947).

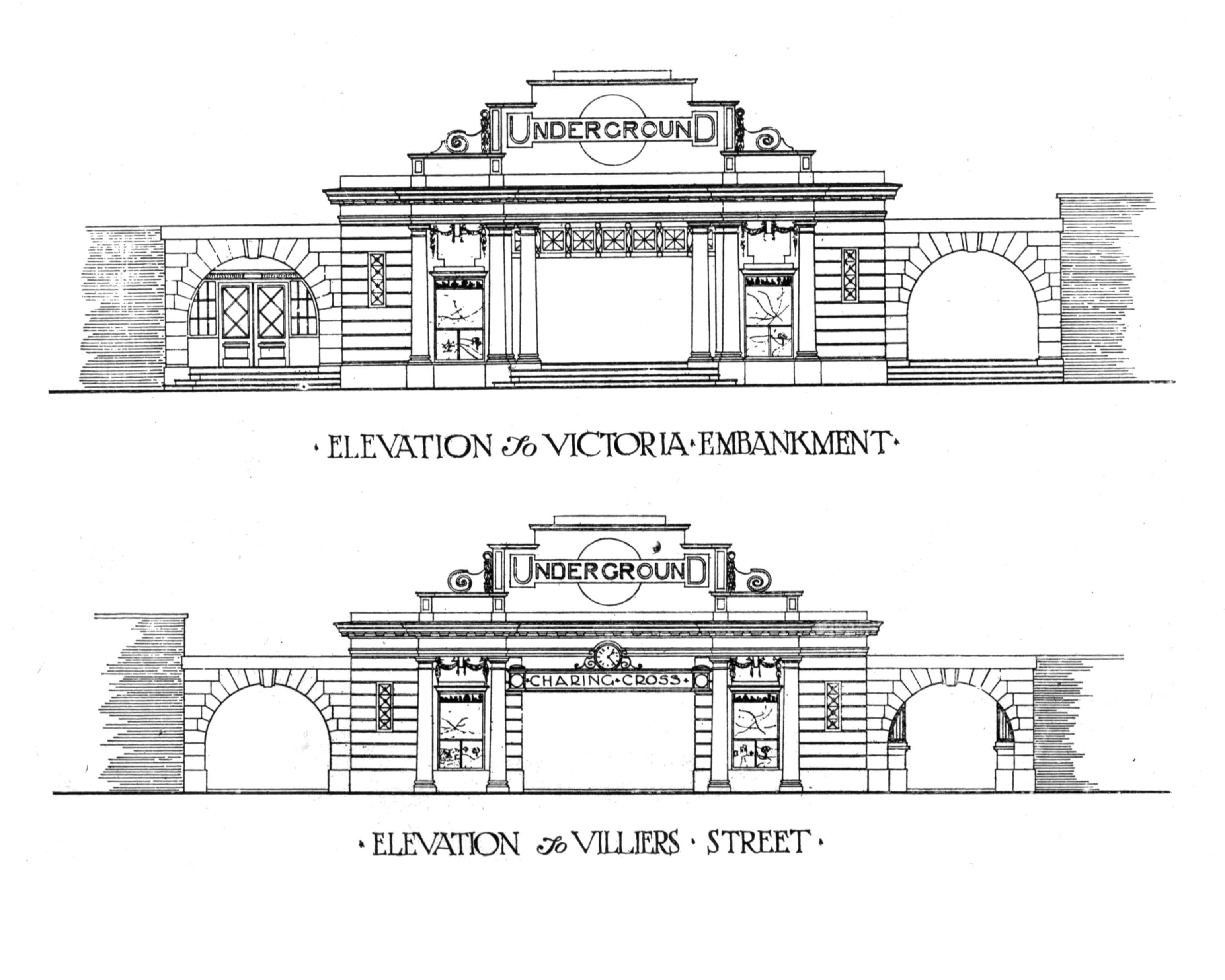
Elevations

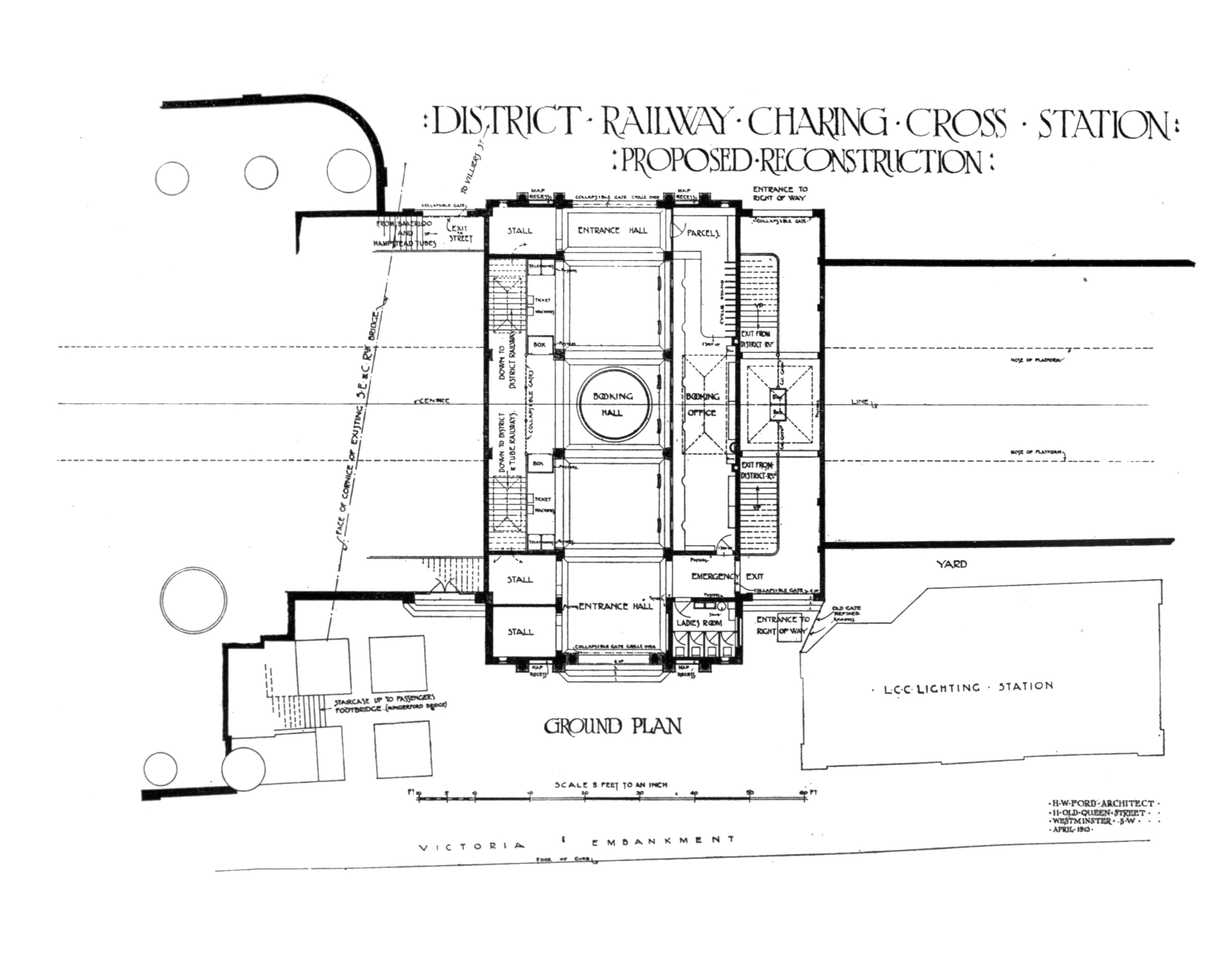
Ground floor

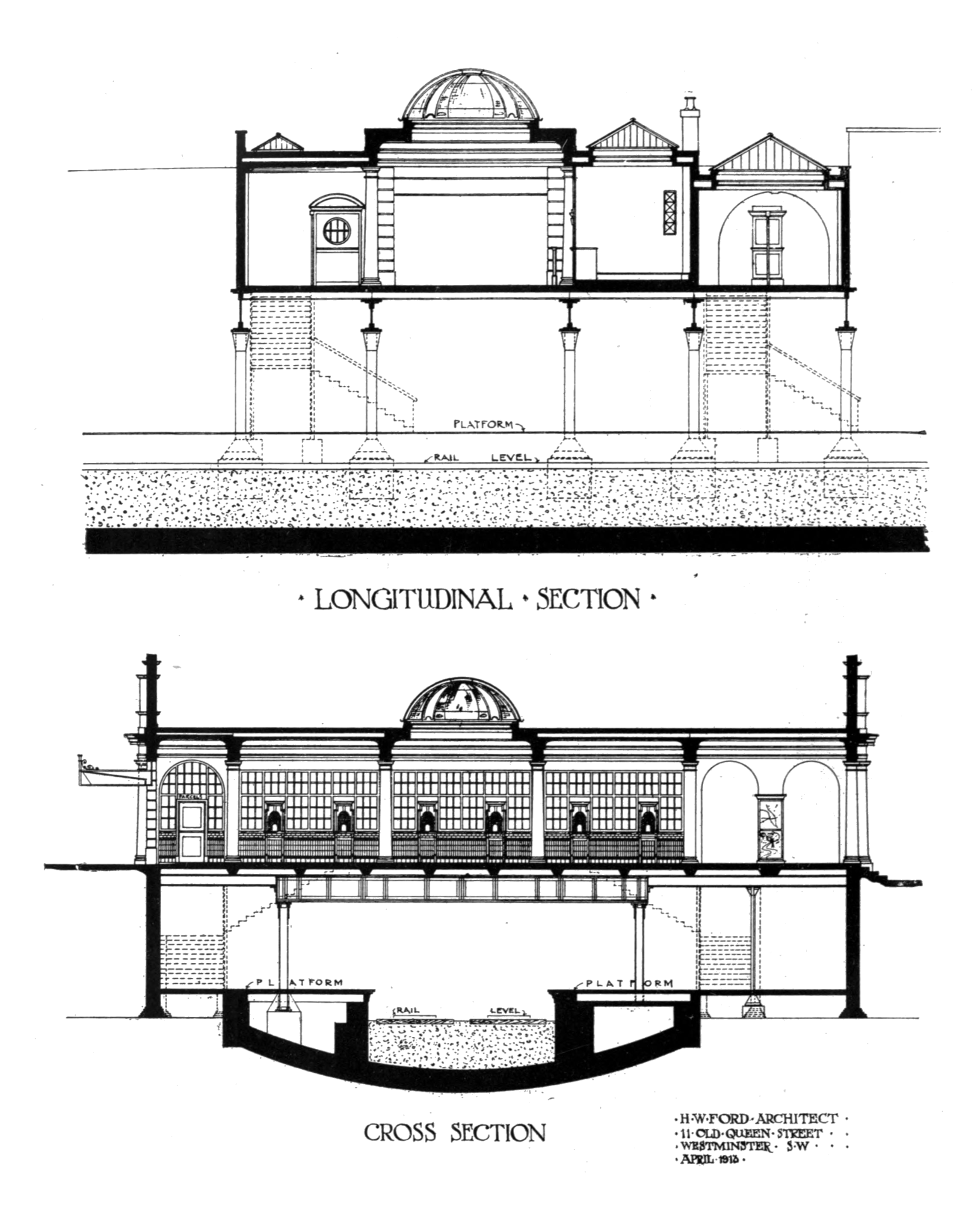
Sections
