= Mark Lane tube station =

Disused station on the London Underground

Mark Lane
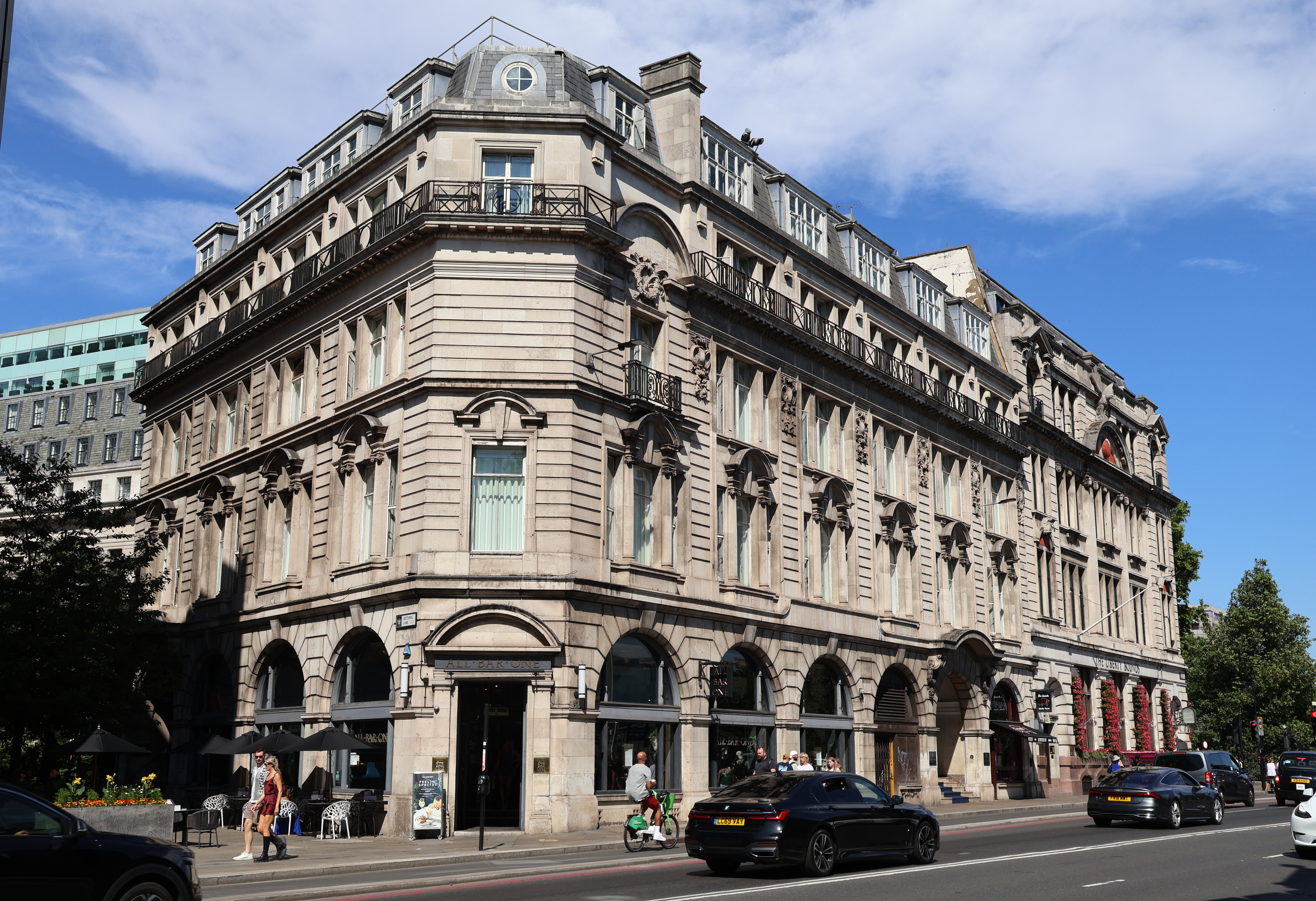
- Mark Lane Station Buildings

General information
- Location: City of London
- Coordinates: 51°30′35″N 0°4′45″W
- Owner: London Transport
- Platforms: 2

Other information
- Status: Disused

History
- Opened: 6 October 1884
- Closed: 4 February 1967
- Electrified: 1905
- Former names: Tower Hill (1946–1967)
- Original company: Metropolitan and Metropolitan District Joint Railway
Location
- Location in the City of London

Mark Lane is a disused station on the London Underground. It was served by the Circle and District lines. In 1946 it was renamed Tower Hill. It was closed in 1967 and the present Tower Hill station was opened as its replacement, located on the same site as the Tower of London station that had closed in 1884. It was named after Mark Lane, the street on which it is located, slightly west of the current Tower Hill station that replaced it in 1967.

== History ==
Mark Lane station was opened on 6 October 1884. It was located on the Metropolitan and Metropolitan District Joint Railway (also known as the City Lines) that connected the eastern end of the District Railway (DR) at Mansion House to the Metropolitan Railway (the Met) at Aldgate and completed the Circle line. (Note: Authorised as the Metropolitan and District (City Lines and Extensions) Railway.) During planning for the station, the name "Seething Lane" was considered. The next station to the west was Monument. The next station to the east was Tower of London, that had been opened by the Met on 25 September 1882 as the temporary terminus of a short extension from Aldgate. The DR refused to sell tickets to this station and it closed on 13 October 1884. Thereafter the next stations to the east were Aldgate and Aldgate East. Electric services commenced on 1 July 1905 and all services were electric by 24 September 1905. The above-ground part of the station (then just a single storey) was rebuilt during 1909-1911 to designs by George Sherrin. The five upper storeys comprised an office block (for Messrs. Van den Berg Ltd.) designed by Delissa Joseph, were completed in 1922. The office block was named Mark Lane Station Buildings.

The station was referred to in early plans as Trinity Square, and later named Seething Lane, but it was ultimately given the more recognisable name Mark Lane (the street on which London's Corn Exchanges were located). On 1 September 1946, the station was renamed Tower Hill. The station was earmarked for closure due to overwhelming passenger numbers and little space available for expansion. It was closed on 4 February 1967 and the present Tower Hill station was opened as its replacement, located on the same site as the Tower of London station that had closed in 1884. The underground section of Mark Lane station can still be seen between Monument and Tower Hill, though only one platform on the eastbound track now remains due to redevelopment of the track. The surface station, sited in Seething Lane, can be seen in the form of a pedestrian subway under the road converted from the old station overbridge, where large white grilles now cover the original stairways down to the platforms.

== In literature ==
The station is referenced by H. V. Morton in his 1925 travel book The Heart of London when he sits in the cab of an underground train travelling from Bow to Ealing.

The disused station features in the 2017 novel Who Sent Clement by Keith A. Pearson as the fictional hiding place for a gold bar from the 1971 Baker Street robbery. The loot is made as a pay-off to a look-out from the robbery, a former ticket office manager of the then recently closed station.

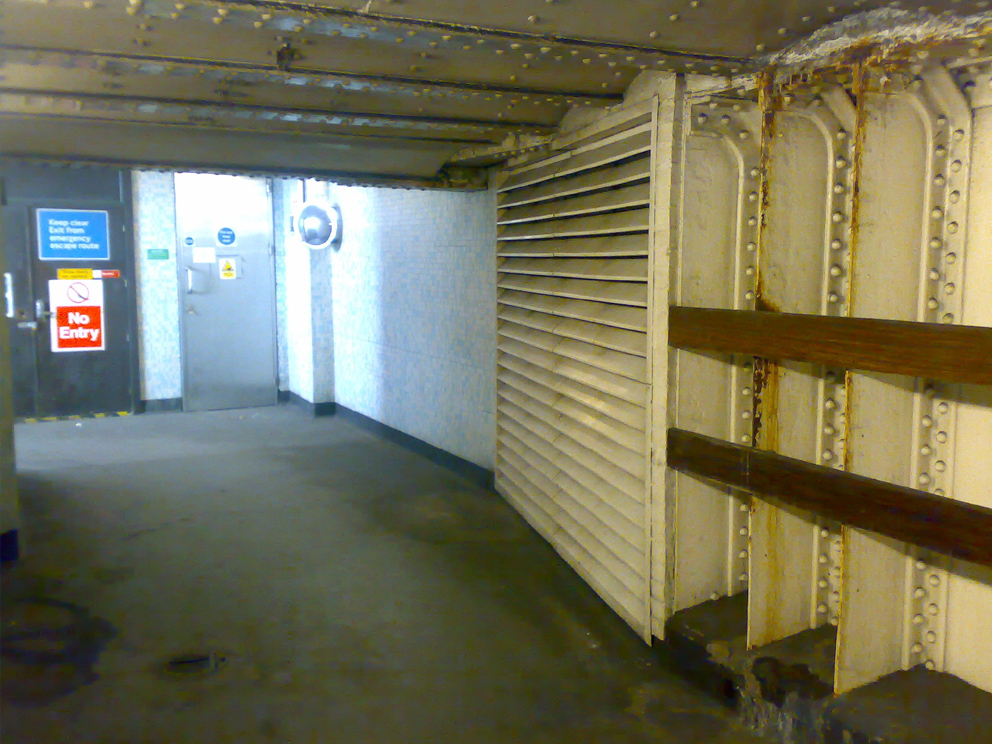

== Notes ==
Preceding station	London Underground	Following station
Monument towards Edgware Road via Victoria	Circle line	Aldgate towards Edgware Road via Aldgate
Monument towards Wimbledon, Richmond or Ealing Broadway	District line	Aldgate East towards Upminster
