= Tower Hill tube station =

London Underground station

Tower Hill
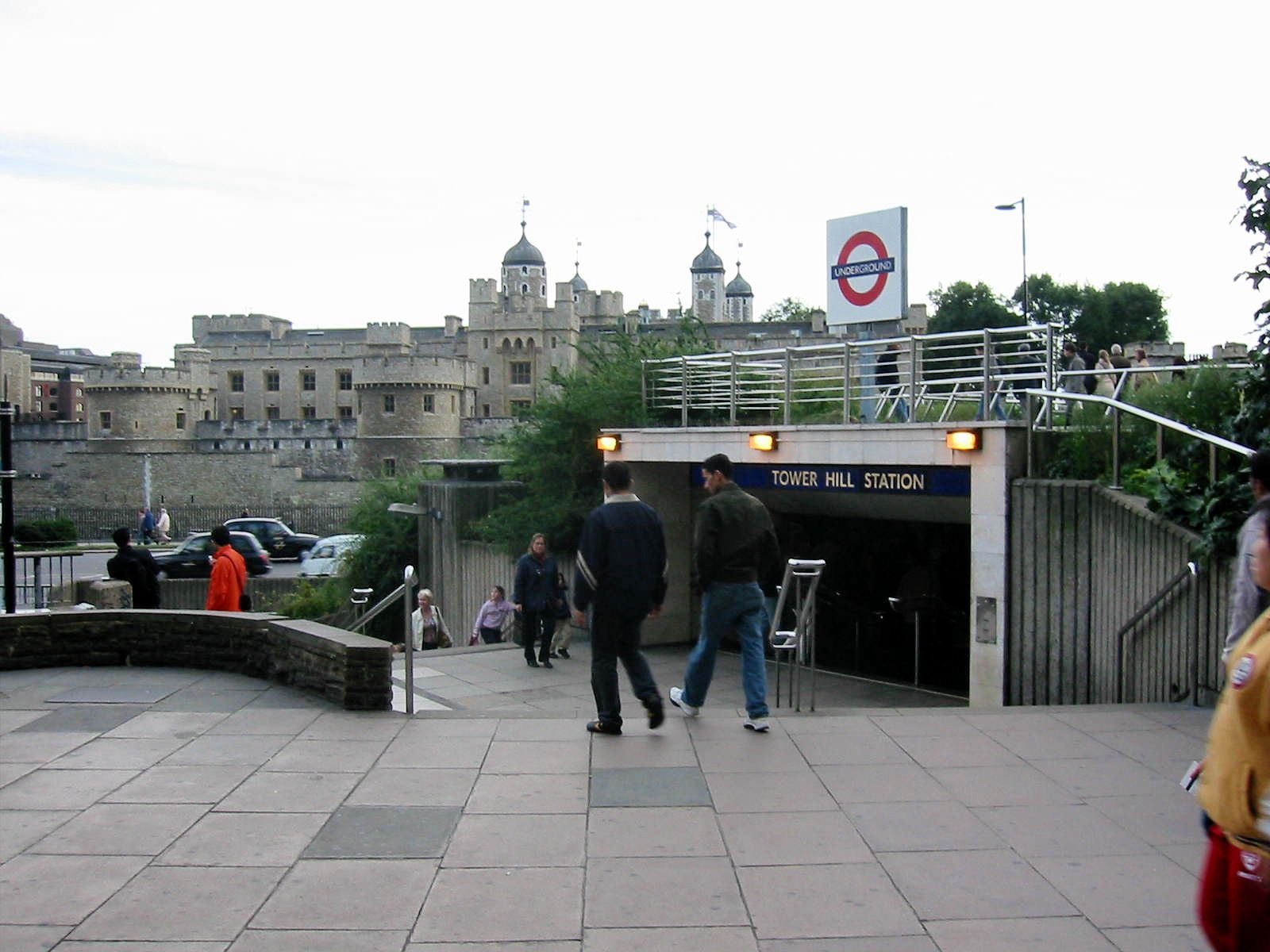
- Entrance opposite the Tower of London
- Interactive map of Tower Hill

General information
- Location: Tower Hill
- Local authority: London Borough of Tower Hamlets
- Managed by: London Underground
- Owner: Transport for London
- Number of platforms: 3
- Accessible: Yes
- Fare zone: 1
- OSI: Fenchurch Street; Tower Gateway
- Cycle parking: No
- Toilet facilities: No

London Underground annual entry and exit
- 2021: ▲7.33 million
- 2022: ▲15.40 million
- 2023: ▼14.97 million
- 2024: ▲15.71 million
- 2025: ▲16.10 million

Railway companies
- Original company: London Transport Executive

Key dates
- 4 February 1967: Opened

Other information
- External links: TfL station info page
- Coordinates: 51.51°N 0.076°W

Tower Hill is a London Underground station in Tower Hill in the East End of London. It is served by the Circle and District lines, and is located in London fare zone 1. It is a short distance from Tower Gateway station for the Docklands Light Railway, Fenchurch Street station for National Rail mainline services, and Tower Millennium Pier for River Services.

On the Circle line, the station is between Aldgate and Monument stations. On the District line, it is between Monument and Aldgate East stations.

The station was built on the site of the former Tower of London station that closed in 1884. The present Tower Hill station opened in 1967 and replaced a nearby station with the same name but which was originally called Mark Lane, that was slightly to the west.

== History ==
In 2021, Transport for London made Tower Hill the tenth Underground station to replace some standard platform logos with 'poppy roundels' for the period leading up to Remembrance Day each year. Opposite the station in Trinity Square Gardens is The Merchant Navy Memorial commemorating merchant seafarers lost in the two World Wars and Falklands Campaign who have no grave but the sea. Its total of some 36,000 names is greater than that of any other Commonwealth War Graves Commission memorial in the UK.

== Design ==
The entrance to Tower Hill station is a few metres from one of the largest remaining segments of the Roman London Wall which once surrounded the historic City of London. A small section of this wall is visible above the track at the far Eastern end of the Westbound platform, near the ceiling.

== Services ==
Train frequencies vary throughout the day, but the typical off-peak service pattern is:

- District line:
  - Eastbound:
    - 12 tph (trains per hour) to Upminster.
    - 3 tph to Barking
    - 3 tph terminate here
  - Westbound:
    - 6 tph to Ealing Broadway;
    - 6 tph to Richmond;
    - 6 tph to Wimbledon.
- Circle line:
  - Anti-clockwise:
    - 6 tph to Hammersmith via Aldgate.
  - Clockwise:
    - 6 tph to Edgware Road via Embankment.

Preceding station	London Underground	Following station
Monument towards Edgware Road via Victoria	Circle line	Aldgate towards Hammersmith via King's Cross St Pancras
Monument towards Wimbledon, Richmond or Ealing Broadway	District line	Aldgate East towards Upminster

== Future ==
A Transport Supporting Paper released by the office of the Mayor of London envisages the closure of Tower Gateway DLR station and the branch serving it, with a replacement interchange being provided via new platforms at Tower Hill tube station. The reasoning is given that currently, 90 per cent of DLR City passengers use Bank station, but only 75 per cent of services go there; this would increase service to Bank from 23tph to 30tph, thereby unlocking more capacity on the Bank branch.

== Connections ==
London Buses day and nighttime routes, plus long-distance coach routes serve the station.
