= BuckleyGrayYeoman =

British architecture firm

- Industry: Architecture
- Founded: 1997
- Founder: Richard Buckley, Fiammetta Gray and Matt Yeoman
- Headquarters: London, United Kingdom
- Website: buckleygrayyeoman.com

BuckleyGrayYeoman is a British architectural firm based in the Shoreditch district of London, UK.

== Background ==
Since its establishment, the number of people employed by the practice has grown from three in 1997 to eighty five in 2016. BuckleyGrayYeoman has been based in the Tea Building in Shoreditch for the past 12 years.

== Projects ==
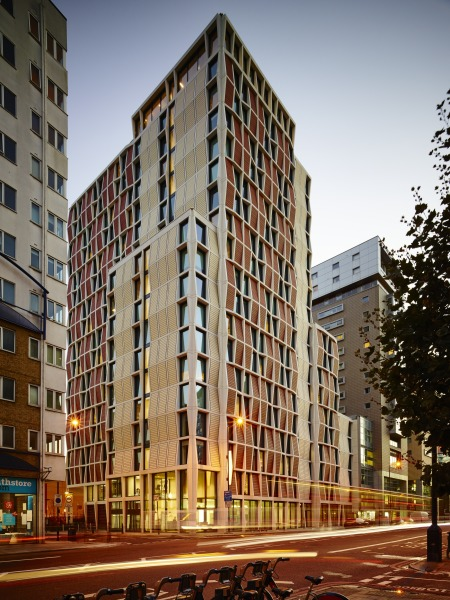
Pure Aldgate

=== Recently completed ===
Recently completed projects include: The Buckley Building for Derwent London, the refurbishment of a former BBC building named for Henry Wood, the founder of the BBC proms, The Pure Aldgate Student Accommodation building (a 19-storey building), The Passage (charity), London's largest voluntary sector day centre for the homeless, new academic and sports buildings for Channing School and Forest School and a number of Citadines Apart'Hotel in the UK and France.

The firm has designed premises in Frankfurt and Bangkok for the Fred Perry clothing company.

=== Current projects ===
Current projects include: a new art hub at Cromwell Place, South Kensington, the commercial office buildings that form part of the regeneration of Bishopsgate GoodsYard in Shoreditch, the revamp of a hundred metres of shop-front at the base of the Newport Sandringham building on Charing Cross Road and in Chinatown, London, the renovation of a Victorian bonded warehouse building, converting it into office spaces for the Granada Studios redevelopment in Manchester.

In January 2015 BuckleyGrayYeoman designed a refurbishment of the Wickhams Department Store in East London which included the removal of the façade of Spiegelhalter's jewellery shop, a well-known historic holdout building. After a petition and a protest campaign with the backing of English Heritage, the Twentieth Century Society and the Victorian Society, the plans were revised to keep the Spiegelhalters façade in May 2015.

=== Other ===
In 2015 the practice completed the refurbishment of the Grade II listed boarding houses at Roedean School in Sussex, originally built by John William Simpson

== Awards ==
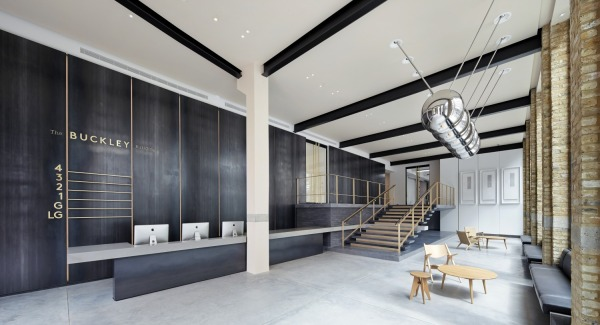
The Buckley Building

In 2015, a design for a Nando's restaurant in Loughton won the Best Fast/Casual category in the Restaurant and Bar Design Awards. In 2015 also, the practice won the WIN Awards for Roedean School, the Retail Week Interior Award for Fred Perry in Covent Garden, the Mixology Awards for Henry Wood House.

== Events and exhibitions ==
- Rethinking Old Street roundabout, Icon Magazine – Clerkenwell Design Week 2014,
- Changing Perceptions, 2012 – New London Architecture
