= List of busiest railway stations in Great Britain (2023–24) =

This is a list of the busiest railway stations in Great Britain on the National Rail network for the 1 April 2023 to 31 March 2024 financial year. The dataset records increased levels of mobility when compared with the 2022–2023 data although still not fully recovered from the peak of 2019–2020. During 2023–2024 there were 1,610 million passenger journeys on the network, compared to 1,385 million in 2022–2023 and 1,739 million in 2019–2020. The busiest station was London Liverpool Street for a second year.

== Methodology ==
The figures are collected by the Office of Rail and Road, and are estimates based on ticket usage data use of an Origin Destination Matrix, a comprehensive matrix of rail flows between stations throughout Great Britain in the financial year of 2023–2024. The data count entries and exits at any station. Note that the data covers mainland Great Britain and surrounding small islands (such as the Isle of Wight), not the United Kingdom, and so exclude tickets within Northern Ireland and Eurostar. There are various further limits to the data due to the variety of ticketing options available on rail services within the UK; these are outlined in full in the report on the data.

Only tickets sold for National Rail services are included; some stations may also be served by underground metro or urban light rail networks. Stations serving solely the London Underground, light rail, special tours or heritage railways are therefore excluded. The London Overground and Elizabeth line are included in the data. Data for 2023–2024 was published on 21 November 2024.

== All stations ==
During 2023–2024 there were 20 stations with more than 20 million entries and exits, compared to 18 stations the previous year and 20 in 2019–2020.

Rank	Railway station	Annual entries/exits (millions) 2023–24	Annual entries/exits (millions) 2022–23	Location	Main services	Number of platforms	Interchange systems	Image
1	London Liverpool Street	94.499	80.448	London	Great Eastern Main Line; West Anglia Main Line; Lea Valley lines; Elizabeth line; London Overground	19 (Note: One platform was removed and two added with the opening of the Elizabeth line)	London Underground	
2	London Paddington	66.859	59.182	London	Great Western Main Line; South Wales Main Line; Reading to Plymouth Line; Elizabeth line	15 (Note: Excluding London Underground, platform 13 closed, two platforms were added with the opening of the Elizabeth line)	London Underground	
3	Tottenham Court Road	64.219	34.877	London	Elizabeth line	2 (Note: Excluding London Underground)	London Underground	
4	London Waterloo	62.525	57.789	London	South West Main Line; West of England Main Line	24 (Note: Platforms 25 and 26 are part of the London Underground)	London Underground	
5	Stratford	56.570	44.136	London	Great Eastern Main Line; West Anglia Main Line; Lea Valley lines; Elizabeth line; London Overground	9 (Note: Excluding London Underground and Docklands Light Railway, 4 and 7 disused, 3A, 4A, 4B, and 10A exist)	London Underground; Docklands Light Railway	
6	London Victoria	50.829	45.563	London	Brighton Main Line; Chatham Main Line	19	London Underground	
7	London Bridge	50.045	47.657	London	South Eastern Main Line; Brighton Main Line; Thameslink	15	London Underground	
8	Farringdon	46.049	31.459	London	Thameslink; Elizabeth line	4	London Underground	
9	Bond Street	38.307	19.400	London	Elizabeth line	2	London Underground	
10	London Euston	36.185	31.318	London	West Coast Main Line; London Overground	16	London Underground	
11	London St Pancras International	35.959	33.296	London	Midland Main Line; Thameslink; High Speed 1	15	London Underground; Eurostar	
12	Whitechapel	35.246	23.307	London	London Overground; Elizabeth line	4	London Underground	
13	Birmingham New Street	33.335	30.726	Birmingham	West Coast Main Line; Cross Country Route	12	West Midlands Metro	
14	Manchester Piccadilly	25.776	23.558	Manchester	West Coast Main Line	14	Manchester Metrolink	
15	Glasgow Central	24.964	20.767	Glasgow	West Coast Main Line	17	Glasgow Subway (Note: St Enoch station is close by)	
16	Leeds	24.891	23.964	Leeds	East Coast Main Line; Midland Main Line; Cross Country Route	18		
17	London King's Cross	24.483	23.287	London	East Coast Main Line	11 (Note: Platform numbering starts at 0)	London Underground	
18	Clapham Junction	22.858	20.790	London	South West Main Line; West of England Main Line; Brighton Main Line; London Overground	17		
19	Highbury & Islington	21.827	20.601	London	Northern City Line; London Overground	6	London Underground	
20	Edinburgh Waverley	21.307	18.213	Edinburgh	East Coast Main Line; West Coast Main Line	20	Edinburgh Trams	

== See also ==
- List of busiest railway stations in Great Britain (2022–23)
- List of busiest railway stations in Great Britain (2021–22)
- List of busiest railway stations in Great Britain (2020–21)
- List of busiest railway stations in Great Britain (2019–20)
- List of busiest London Underground stations
- List of busiest railway stations
- List of busiest railway stations in Europe
- List of busiest railway stations in North America
- List of busiest railway stations in West Yorkshire
