= List of busiest railway stations in Great Britain (2022–23) =

This is a list of the busiest railway stations in Great Britain on the National Rail network for the 1 April 2022 to 31 March 2023 financial year. The dataset records patterns of mobility for the first full year after travel restrictions during the COVID-19 pandemic in the United Kingdom were completely eliminated, with increased levels of mobility when compared with the 2021–22 data although still not fully recovered from 2019–20. During 2022–23 there were 1,385 million passenger journeys on the network, compared to 990 million in 2021–22 and 1,739 million in 2019–20. The opening of the Elizabeth line during 2022 increased passenger numbers at several stations and caused new entries to appear in the ranking at Tottenham Court Road (7th) and Bond Street (19th). The busiest station was London Liverpool Street, replacing London Waterloo which was top of the ranking the previous year. (Note: Waterloo had been the busiest station for over a decade, except for during 2020-21 when Stratford was the busiest station.)

== Methodology ==
The figures are collected by the Office of Rail and Road, and are estimates based on ticket usage data use of an Origin Destination Matrix, a comprehensive matrix of rail flows between stations throughout Great Britain in the financial year 2022–23. The data count entries and exits at all stations. The data cover mainland Great Britain and surrounding small islands (such as the Isle of Wight), not the United Kingdom, and so exclude tickets within Northern Ireland and Eurostar. There are various further limits to the data due to the variety of ticketing options available on rail services within the UK; these are outlined in full in the report on the data. Only tickets sold for National Rail services are included; some stations are also served by underground metro or urban light rail networks. Stations serving solely the London Underground, light rail, special tours or heritage railways are therefore excluded. The London Overground and Elizabeth line are included in the data. Data for 2022–23 were published on 14 December 2023.

== List of stations ==
During 2022–23 there were 18 stations with more than 20 million entries and exits, compared to 9 stations the previous year and 20 in 2019–20.

| Rank | Railway station | Annual entries/exits (millions) | | City | Main services | Number of platforms | Interchange systems | Image |
| Rank | Railway station | 2022–23 | 2021–22 | City | Main services | Number of platforms | Interchange systems | Image |
|---|---|---|---|---|---|---|---|---|
| 1 | London Liverpool Street | 80.448 | 32.165 | London | Great Eastern Main Line; West Anglia Main Line; Elizabeth line; London Overground | 19 (Note: One platform was removed and two added with the opening of the Elizabeth line) | London Underground | |
| 2 | London Paddington | 59.182 | 23.870 | London | Great Western Main Line; South Wales Main Line; Reading to Plymouth Line; Elizabeth line | 15 (Note: Excluding London Underground, platform 13 closed, two platforms were added with the opening of the Elizabeth line) | London Underground | |
| 3 | London Waterloo | 57.789 | 41.426 | London | South West Main Line; West of England Main Line | 24 (Note: Platforms 25 and 26 are part of the London Underground) | London Underground | |
| 4 | London Bridge | 47.657 | 33.309 | London | South Eastern Main Line; Brighton Main Line; Thameslink | 15 | London Underground | |
| 5 | London Victoria | 45.563 | 36.776 | London | Brighton Main Line; Chatham Main Line | 19 | London Underground | |
| 6 | Stratford | 44.136 | 28.182 | London | Great Eastern Main Line; Lea Valley lines; Elizabeth line; London Overground | 9 (Note: Excluding London Underground and Docklands Light Railway, 4 and 7 disused, 3A, 4A, 4B, and 10A exist) | London Underground; Docklands Light Railway | |
| 7 | Tottenham Court Road | 34.877 | N/A | London | Elizabeth line | 2 (Note: Excluding London Underground) | London Underground | |
| 8 | London St Pancras International | 33.296 | 18.995 | London | Midland Main Line; Thameslink; High Speed 1 | 15 | London Underground; Eurostar | |
| 9 | Farringdon | 31.459 | 6.865 | London | Thameslink; Elizabeth line | 4 | London Underground | |
| 10 | London Euston | 31.318 | 23.097 | London | West Coast Main Line; London Overground | 18 | London Underground | |
| 11 | Birmingham New Street | 30.726 | 22.682 | Birmingham | West Coast Main Line; Cross Country Route | 12 | West Midlands Metro | |
| 12 | Leeds | 23.964 | 19.263 | Leeds | East Coast Main Line; Midland Main Line; Cross Country Route | 18 | | |
| 13 | Manchester Piccadilly | 23.558 | 19.581 | Manchester | West Coast Main Line | 14 | Manchester Metrolink | |
| 14 | Whitechapel | 23.307 | 9.273 | London | London Overground; Elizabeth line | 4 | London Underground | |
| 15 | London King's Cross | 23.287 | 20.476 | London | East Coast Main Line | 11 (Note: Platform numbering starts at 0) | London Underground | |
| 16 | Clapham Junction | 20.790 | 17.397 | London | South West Main Line; West of England Main Line; Brighton Main Line; London Overground | 17 | | |
| 17 | Glasgow Central | 20.767 | 15.322 | Glasgow | West Coast Main Line | 17 | Glasgow Subway (Note: St Enoch station is close by) | |
| 18 | Highbury & Islington | 20.601 | 17.816 | London | Northern City Line; London Overground | 6 | London Underground | |
| 19 | Bond Street | 19.400 | N/A | London | Elizabeth line | 2 | London Underground | |
| 20 | East Croydon | 18.514 | 14.504 | London | Brighton Main Line; Thameslink | 6 | Tramlink | |

== See also ==
- List of busiest railway stations in Great Britain (2021–22)
- List of busiest railway stations in Great Britain (2020–21)
- List of busiest railway stations in Great Britain (2019–20)
- List of busiest London Underground stations
- List of busiest railway stations in Europe
- List of busiest railway stations in North America
- List of busiest railway stations in West Yorkshire
