= List of busiest railway stations in Great Britain (2024–25) =

This is a list of the busiest railway stations in Great Britain on the National Rail network for the 1 April 2024 to 31 March 2025 financial year. The dataset records increased levels of mobility when compared with the 2023–2024 data and nearing a return to the peak of 2019–2020. During 2024–2025 there were 1,730 million passenger journeys on the network, compared to 1,610 million in 2023–2024 and 1,739 million in 2019–2020. The busiest station was London Liverpool Street for a third year.

== Methodology ==
The figures are collected by the Office of Rail and Road, and are estimates based on ticket usage data use of an Origin Destination Matrix, a comprehensive matrix of rail flows between stations throughout Great Britain in the financial year of 2024–2025. The data count entries and exits at any station. Note that the data covers mainland Great Britain and surrounding small islands (such as the Isle of Wight), not the United Kingdom, and so exclude tickets within Northern Ireland and Eurostar. There are various further limits to the data due to the variety of ticketing options available on rail services within the UK; these are outlined in full in the report on the data.

Only tickets sold for National Rail services are included; some stations may also be served by underground metro or urban light rail networks. Stations serving solely the London Underground, light rail, special tours or heritage railways are therefore excluded. The London Overground and Elizabeth line are included in the data. Data for 2024–2025 was published on 4 December 2025.

== All stations ==
During 2024–2025 there were 22 stations with more than 20 million entries and exits, compared to 20 stations the previous year and 20 in 2019–2020. Out of the 22 busiest stations, 16 are in London.

Rank	Railway station	Annual entries/exits (millions) 2024–25	Annual entries/exits (millions) 2023–24	Location	Main services	Number of platforms	Interchange systems	Image
1	London Liverpool Street	98.016	94.499	London	Great Eastern Main Line; West Anglia Main Line; Lea Valley lines; Elizabeth line; London Overground	19 (Note: One platform was removed and two added with the opening of the Elizabeth line)	London Underground	
2	London Waterloo	70.390	62.525	London	South West Main Line; West of England Main Line	24 (Note: Platforms 25 and 26 are part of the London Underground)	London Underground	
3	London Paddington	69.897	66.859	London	Great Western Main Line; South Wales Main Line; Reading to Plymouth Line; Elizabeth line	15 (Note: Excluding London Underground, platform 13 closed, two platforms were added with the opening of the Elizabeth line)	London Underground	
4	Tottenham Court Road	68.134	64.219	London	Elizabeth line	2 (Note: Excluding London Underground)	London Underground	
5	London Bridge	53.784	50.045	London	South Eastern Main Line; Brighton Main Line; Thameslink	15	London Underground	
6	London Victoria	53.784	50.829	London	Brighton Main Line; Chatham Main Line	19	London Underground	
7	Stratford	51.474	56.570	London	Great Eastern Main Line; West Anglia Main Line; Lea Valley lines; Elizabeth line; London Overground	9 (Note: Excluding London Underground and Docklands Light Railway, 4 and 7 disused, 3A, 4A, 4B, and 10A exist)	London Underground; Docklands Light Railway	
8	Farringdon	50.171	46.049	London	Thameslink; Elizabeth line	4	London Underground	
9	Bond Street	42.752	38.307	London	Elizabeth line	2	London Underground	
10	London Euston	40.249	36.185	London	West Coast Main Line; London Overground	16	London Underground	
11	London St Pancras International	38.843	35.959	London	Midland Main Line; Thameslink; High Speed 1	15	London Underground; Eurostar	
12	Whitechapel	37.141	35.246	London	London Overground; Elizabeth line	4	London Underground	
13	Birmingham New Street	36.624	33.335	Birmingham	West Coast Main Line; Cross Country Route	12	West Midlands Metro	
14	London King's Cross	27.727	24.483	London	East Coast Main Line	11 (Note: Platform numbering starts at 0)	London Underground	
15	Manchester Piccadilly	27.402	25.776	Manchester	West Coast Main Line	14	Manchester Metrolink	
16	Leeds	27.310	24.891	Leeds	East Coast Main Line; Midland Main Line; Cross Country Route	18		
17	Glasgow Central	25.294	24.964	Glasgow	West Coast Main Line	17	Glasgow Subway (Note: St Enoch station is close by)	
18	Clapham Junction	24.448	22.858	London	South West Main Line; West of England Main Line; Brighton Main Line; London Overground	17		
19	Highbury & Islington	23.983	21.827	London	Northern City Line; London Overground	6	London Underground	
20	Edinburgh Waverley	22.755	21.307	Edinburgh	East Coast Main Line; West Coast Main Line	20	Edinburgh Trams	
21	East Croydon	21.211	19.605	London	Brighton Main Line	6	Tramlink	
22	Gatwick Airport	20.592	19.490	Crawley	Brighton Main Line	7		

== See also ==
- List of busiest railway stations in Great Britain (2023–24)
- List of busiest London Underground stations
- List of busiest railway stations
- List of busiest railway stations in Europe
- List of busiest railway stations in North America
- List of busiest railway stations in West Yorkshire
