= List of busiest railway stations in Great Britain (2021–22) =

This is a list of the busiest railway stations in Great Britain on the National Rail network for the 1 April 2021 to 31 March 2022 financial year. The dataset records patterns of mobility during the second year of the COVID-19 pandemic in the United Kingdom, with significantly reduced levels of mobility compared with the 2019–20 data. Extended periods of significantly reduced commuting and long distance travel caused many major stations to drop in the ranking. During 2021–22 there were 990 million passenger journeys on the network, compared to 388 million in 2020–21 and 1,739 million in 2019–20. With pandemic restrictions eliminated during the year, passenger levels during 2021–22 were more than double those of the previous year. The busiest station was London Waterloo, replacing Stratford which was top of the ranking the previous year.

== Methodology ==
The figures are collected by the Office of Rail and Road, and are estimates based on ticket usage data use of an Origin Destination Matrix, a comprehensive matrix of rail flows between stations throughout Great Britain in the financial year of 2021–22. The data count entries and exits at any station. Note that the data covers mainland Great Britain and surrounding small islands (such as the Isle of Wight), not the United Kingdom, and so exclude tickets within Northern Ireland and Eurostar. There are various further limits to the data due to the variety of ticketing options available on rail services within the UK; these are outlined in full in the report on the data. Only tickets sold for National Rail services are included; some stations may also be served by underground metro or urban light rail networks. Stations serving solely the London Underground, light rail, special tours or heritage railways are therefore excluded. The London Overground, TfL Rail and Merseyrail are included in the data. Data for 2021–22 was published on 24 November 2022.

== All stations ==
During 2021–22 there were 24 stations with more than 10 million entries and exits, compared to five stations the previous year and 43 in 2019–20.

Rank	Railway station	Annual entries/exits (millions) 2021–22	Annual entries/exits (millions) 2020–21	Location	Main services	Number of platforms	Interchange systems	Image
1	London Waterloo	41.426	12.215	London	South West Main Line; West of England Main Line	24 (Note: Platforms 25 and 26 are part of the London Underground)	London Underground	
2	London Victoria	36.776	13.791	London	Brighton Main Line; Chatham Main Line	19	London Underground	
3	London Bridge	33.309	13.764	London	South Eastern Main Line; Brighton Main Line; Thameslink	15	London Underground	
4	London Liverpool Street	32.165	11.212	London	Great Eastern Main Line; West Anglia Main Line; London Overground; TfL Rail	17 (Note: One platform was removed in preparation for the Elizabeth line)	London Underground	
5	Stratford	28.182	13.985	London	Great Eastern Main Line; Lea Valley Lines; London Overground; TfL Rail	9 (Note: Excluding London Underground and Docklands Light Railway, 4 and 7 disused, 3A, 4A, 4B, and 10A exist)	London Underground; Docklands Light Railway	
6	London Paddington	23.870	6.392	London	Great Western Main Line; South Wales Main Line; Reading to Plymouth Line; TfL Rail	13 (Note: Excluding London Underground, platform 13 closed)	London Underground	
7	London Euston	23.097	6.607	London	West Coast Main Line; London Overground	18	London Underground	
8	Birmingham New Street	22.682	7.351	Birmingham	West Coast Main Line; Cross Country Route	13	West Midlands Metro	
9	London King's Cross	20.476	4.668	London	East Coast Main Line	11 (Note: Platform numbering starts at 0)	London Underground	
10	Manchester Piccadilly	19.581	5.188	Manchester	West Coast Main Line	14	Manchester Metrolink	
11	Leeds	19.263	5.854	Leeds	East Coast Main Line; Midland Main Line; Cross Country Route	18		
12	London St Pancras International	18.995	6.363	London	Midland Main Line; Thameslink; High Speed 1	15	London Underground; Eurostar	
13	Highbury & Islington	17.816	8.661	London	London Overground; Northern City Line	6 (Note: Excluding London Underground)	London Underground	
14	Clapham Junction	17.397	8.371	London	South West Main Line; West of England Main Line; Brighton Main Line; London Overground	17		
15	London Charing Cross	15.733	5.373	London	South Eastern Main Line	6	London Underground	
16	Glasgow Central	15.322	5.325	Glasgow	West Coast Main Line	17	Glasgow Subway (Note: St Enoch station is close by)	
17	East Croydon	14.504	6.695	London	Brighton Main Line	6	Tramlink	
18	Canada Water	13.645	5.576	London	London Overground	2	London Underground	
19	Edinburgh Waverley	13.617	2.958	Edinburgh	East Coast Main Line; West Coast Main Line	20	Edinburgh Trams	
20	Vauxhall	11.651	4.987	London	South West Main Line	8	London Underground	
21	Barking	11.232	6.743	London	London, Tilbury and Southend line; London Overground	5	London Underground	
22	Brighton	11.228	4.149	Brighton	Brighton Main Line; West Coastway line; East Coastway line	8		
23	Liverpool Central	10.747	3.606	Liverpool	Merseyrail	3		
24	Liverpool Lime Street	10.464	3.511	Liverpool	West Coast Main Line; Liverpool to Manchester Lines; Merseyrail	10		
25	Wimbledon	9.952	4.433	London	South West Main Line	4 (Note: Excludes London Underground, 10a and 10b are Tramlink)	London Underground; Tramlink	
26	Whitechapel	9.273	4.142	London	London Overground	2	London Underground	
27	Reading	8.818	2.963	Reading	Great Western Main Line	15		
28	Glasgow Queen Street	8.467	2.299	Glasgow	Glasgow to Edinburgh line	9	Glasgow Subway (Note: Buchanan Street station is close by)	
29	York	8.091	1.836	York	East Coast Main Line	11		
30	London Fenchurch Street	7.795	3.200	London	London, Tilbury and Southend line	4		
31	London Marylebone	7.488	2.035	London	Chiltern Main Line	6	London Underground	
32	Cardiff Central	7.463	1.975	Cardiff	South Wales Main Line	8		
33	West Ham	7.450	4.012	London	London, Tilbury and Southend line	2 (Note: Excluding London Underground and Docklands Light Railway)	London Underground Docklands Light Railway	
34	Sheffield	7.205	1.907	Sheffield	Midland Main Line	9 (Note: 9 train, 2 tram)	Sheffield Supertram	
35	Newcastle	7.040	8.815	Newcastle	East Coast Main Line	12	Tyne and Wear Metro	
36	London Cannon Street	7.023	2.684	London	South Eastern Main Line	7	London Underground	
37	Cambridge	6.952	2.301	Cambridge	West Anglia Main Line	8		
38	Farringdon	6.865	2.643	London	Thameslink	2	London Underground	
39	Bristol Temple Meads	6.628	2.033	Bristol	South Wales Main Line; Cross Country Route; Wessex Main Line	13		
40	Richmond	6.423	2.699	London	London Overground	7	London Underground	
41	Romford	6.287	3.133	London	Great Eastern Main Line; London Overground; TfL Rail	5		
42	Tottenham Hale	6.096	2.652	London	West Anglia Main Line	3	London Underground	
43	London Blackfriars	5.982	2.100	London	Thameslink	4	London Underground	
44	Gatwick Airport	5.919	1.686	Crawley	Brighton Main Line	7		
45	Manchester Victoria	5.820	1.542	Manchester		6	Manchester Metrolink	
46	Seven Sisters	5.400	2.359	London	London Overground	2	London Underground	
47	Willesden Junction	5.357	2.796	London	London Overground	5	London Underground	
48	Lewisham	5.248	2.555	London	North Kent Line; Mid-Kent Line	4	Docklands Light Railway	
49	Nottingham	5.202	1.417	Nottingham	Midland Main Line	7	Nottingham Express Transit	
50	Waterloo East	5.109	2.194	London	South Eastern Main Line; North Kent Line	4	London Underground	
51	Oxford	5.013	1.575	Oxford	Cotswold Line; Oxford–Bicester line	4		
52	Shepherd's Bush	5.009	2.272	London	London Overground	2	London Underground	
53	Surbiton	4.987	1.945	London	South West Main Line	4		
54	Shoreditch High Street	4.843	1.403	London	London Overground	2		
55	Moorfields	4.808	1.613	Liverpool	Merseyrail	3		
56	Ealing Broadway	4.768	2.066	London	Great Western Main Line; TfL Rail	4	London Underground	
57	Ilford	4.754	2.536	London	TfL Rail	4 (Note: 4 operational; 1 disused)		
58	Coventry	4.636	1.747	Coventry	West Coast Main Line; Cross Country Route	4		
59	Finsbury Park	4.599	2.014	London	Northern City Line; Thameslink	4	London Underground	
60	Bromley South	4.600	2.025	London	Chatham Main Line; Maidstone East Line; Catford Loop Line	4		

== See also ==
- List of busiest railway stations in Great Britain (2022–23)
- List of busiest railway stations in Great Britain (2020–21)
- List of busiest railway stations in Great Britain (2019–20)
- List of busiest London Underground stations
- List of busiest railway stations in Europe
- List of busiest railway stations in North America
- List of busiest railway stations in West Yorkshire
