= List of busiest railway stations in Great Britain =

This is a list of the busiest railway stations in Great Britain on the National Rail network for the 1 April 2025 to 31 March 2026 financial year. The dataset records increased levels of mobility when compared with the 2024–2025 data and exceeding the previous peak of 2019–2020. During 2025–2026 there were 1,829 million passenger journeys on the network, compared to 1,730 million in 2023–2024 and 1,739 million in 2019–2020. The busiest station was London Liverpool Street for a fourth year.

== Methodology ==
The figures are collected by the Office of Rail and Road, and are estimates based on ticket usage data use of an Origin Destination Matrix, a comprehensive matrix of rail flows between stations throughout Great Britain in the financial year of 2025–2026. The data count entries and exits at any station. Note that the data covers mainland Great Britain and surrounding small islands (such as the Isle of Wight), not the United Kingdom, and so exclude tickets within Northern Ireland and Eurostar. There are various further limits to the data due to the variety of ticketing options available on rail services within the UK; these are outlined in full in the report on the data.

Only tickets sold for National Rail services are included; some stations may also be served by underground metro or urban light rail networks. Stations serving solely the London Underground, light rail, special tours or heritage railways are therefore excluded. The London Overground and Elizabeth line are included in the data. Data for 2025–2026 was published on 19 November 2026

== All stations ==
During 2025–2026 there were 23 stations with more than 20 million entries and exits, compared to 22 stations the previous year and 20 in 2019–2020. Out of the 23 busiest stations, 17 are in London.

Rank	Railway station	Annual entries/exits (millions) 2025–26	Annual entries/exits (millions) 2024–25	Location	Main services	Number of platforms	Interchange systems	Image
1	London Liverpool Street	102.707	98.016	London	Great Eastern Main Line; West Anglia Main Line; Lea Valley lines; Elizabeth line; London Overground	19 (Note: One platform was removed and two added with the opening of the Elizabeth line)	London Underground	
2	London Paddington	72.920	69.897	London	Great Western Main Line; South Wales Main Line; Reading to Plymouth Line; Elizabeth line	15 (Note: Excluding London Underground, platform 13 closed, two platforms were added with the opening of the Elizabeth line)	London Underground	
3	London Waterloo	71.638	70.390	London	South West Main Line; West of England Main Line	24 (Note: Platforms 25 and 26 are part of the London Underground)	London Underground	
4	Tottenham Court Road	67.160	68.134	London	Elizabeth line	2 (Note: Excluding London Underground)	London Underground	
5	London Bridge	56.992	53.784	London	South Eastern Main Line; Brighton Main Line; Thameslink	15	London Underground	
6	Farringdon	55.324	50.171	London	Thameslink; Elizabeth line	4	London Underground	
7	Stratford	54.523	51.474	London	Great Eastern Main Line; West Anglia Main Line; Lea Valley lines; Elizabeth line; London Overground	9 (Note: Excluding London Underground and Docklands Light Railway, 4 and 7 disused, 3A, 4A, 4B, and 10A exist)	London Underground; Docklands Light Railway	
8	London Victoria	53.947	53.784	London	Brighton Main Line; Chatham Main Line	19	London Underground	
9	Bond Street	46.188	42.752	London	Elizabeth line	2	London Underground	
10	London Euston	42.171	40.249	London	West Coast Main Line; London Overground	16	London Underground	
11	London St Pancras International	41.529	38.843	London	Midland Main Line; Thameslink; High Speed 1	15	London Underground; Eurostar	
12	Whitechapel	39.143	37.141	London	London Overground; Elizabeth line	4	London Underground	
13	Birmingham New Street	38.775	36.624	Birmingham	West Coast Main Line; Cross Country Route	12	West Midlands Metro	
14	London King's Cross	28.847	27.727	London	East Coast Main Line	11 (Note: Platform numbering starts at 0)	London Underground	
15	Leeds	27.993	27.310	Leeds	East Coast Main Line; Midland Main Line; Cross Country Route	18		
16	Manchester Piccadilly	26.645	27.402	Manchester	West Coast Main Line	14	Manchester Metrolink	
17	Clapham Junction	25.318	24.448	London	South West Main Line; West of England Main Line; Brighton Main Line; London Overground	17		
18	Glasgow Central	25.064	25.294	Glasgow	West Coast Main Line	17	Glasgow Subway (Note: St Enoch station is close by)	
19	Highbury & Islington	24.622	23.983	London	Northern City Line; London Overground	6	London Underground	
20	Edinburgh Waverley	23.892	22.755	Edinburgh	East Coast Main Line; West Coast Main Line	20	Edinburgh Trams	
21	East Croydon	21.509	21.211	London	Brighton Main Line	6	Tramlink	
22	Gatwick Airport	21.132	20.592	Crawley	Brighton Main Line	7		
23	London Charing Cross	20.854	19.768	London	South Eastern Main Line	6	London Underground	

== See also ==
- List of busiest railway stations in Great Britain (2024–25)
- List of busiest London Underground stations
- List of busiest railway stations
- List of busiest railway stations in Europe
- List of busiest railway stations in North America
- List of busiest railway stations in West Yorkshire
