= List of busiest railway stations in Great Britain (2020–21) =

This is a list of the busiest railway stations in Great Britain on the National Rail network for the 1 April 2020 to 31 March 2021 financial year. The dataset records patterns of mobility during the first year of the COVID-19 pandemic in the United Kingdom with significantly reduced levels of mobility compared with the previous year. Extended periods of significantly reduced commuting and long-distance travel caused many major stations to drop in the ranking. During 2020–21 there were 388 million passenger journeys on the network, compared to 1,739 million in 2019–20. Stratford Regional in London was the busiest station during the year, replacing London Waterloo which had been top of the ranking for 16 years.

== Methodology ==
The figures are collected by the Office of Rail and Road, and are estimates based on ticket usage data use of an Origin Destination Matrix, a comprehensive matrix of rail flows between stations throughout Great Britain in the financial year of 2020–21. The data count entries and exits at any station. Note that the data covers mainland Great Britain and surrounding small islands (such as the Isle of Wight), not the United Kingdom, and so exclude tickets within Northern Ireland and Eurostar. There are various further limits to the data due to the variety of ticketing options available on rail services within the UK; these are outlined in full in the report on the data. Only tickets sold for National Rail services are included; some stations may also be served by underground metro or urban light rail networks. Stations serving solely the London Underground, light rail, special tours or heritage railways are therefore excluded. Data for 2020–21 was published on 25 November 2021.

== All stations ==
Only stations with annual entries and exits above 2 million passengers are shown. There were 5 stations with more than 10 million entries and exits, compared to 43 stations the previous year.

Rank	Railway station	Annual entries/exits (millions) 2020–21	Annual interchanges (millions) 2020–21	Location	Main services	Number of platforms	Interchange systems	Image
1	Stratford	13.985	1.746	London	Great Eastern Main Line; Lea Valley Lines	9 (Note: 4 and 7 disused, 3A, 4A, 4B, and 10A exist)	London Underground, Docklands Light Railway, London Overground	
2	London Victoria	13.791	1.385	London	Brighton Main Line; Chatham Main Line	19	London Underground	
3	London Bridge	13.764	2.361	London	South Eastern Main Line; Brighton Main Line; Thameslink	15	London Underground	
4	London Waterloo	12.215	1.375	London	South West Main Line; West of England Main Line	24 (Note: Platforms 25 and 26 are part of the Underground)	London Underground	
5	London Liverpool Street	11.212	1.131	London	Great Eastern Main Line; West Anglia Main Line	18	London Underground, London Overground	
6	Highbury and Islington	8.661	1.116	London	North London Line; East London Line; Northern City Line	8	London Underground, London Overground	
7	Clapham Junction	8.371	6.824	London	South West Main Line; West of England Main Line; Brighton Main Line	17	London Overground	
8	Birmingham New Street	7.351	1.024	Birmingham	West Coast Main Line; Cross Country Route	13	West Midlands Metro	
9	Barking	6.743	0.263	London	London, Tilbury and Southend line	9	London Underground	
10	East Croydon	6.695	0.972	London	Brighton Main Line	6	Croydon Tramlink	
11	London Euston	6.607	0.843	London	West Coast Main Line	18	London Underground, London Overground	
12	London Paddington	6.392	0.626	London	Great Western Main Line; South Wales Main Line; Reading to Plymouth Line	13 (Note: Platforms 15 and 16 are part of the Underground, platform 13 closed)	London Underground	
13	London St Pancras International	6.363	0.926	London	Midland Main Line; Thameslink; Eurostar; South Eastern High Speed	15	London Underground	
14	Leeds	5.854	0.545	Leeds	East Coast Main Line; Midland Main Line; Cross Country Route	18		
15	Canada Water	5.576	0.000	London	East London Line	4	London Underground	
16	London Charing Cross	5.373	0.092	London	South Eastern Main Line	6	London Underground	
17	Glasgow Central	5.325	0.761	Glasgow	West Coast Main Line	17	Glasgow Subway (close by)	
18	Manchester Piccadilly	5.188	0.374	Manchester	West Coast Main Line	14	Manchester Metrolink	
19	Vauxhall	4.987	0.000	London	South West Main Line	8	London Underground	
20	London King's Cross	4.668	0.430	London	East Coast Main Line	11 (Note: Starts at 0)	London Underground	
21	Wimbledon	4.433	0.303	London	South West Main Line	10 (Note: 10a and 10b are Croydon Tramlink)	London Underground, Croydon Tramlink	
22	Brighton	4.149	0.367	Brighton	Brighton Main Line; West Coastway Line East Coastway Line	8		
23	Whitechapel	4.142	0.000	London	London Overground	4	London Underground	
24	West Ham	4.012	0.003	London	London, Tilbury and Southend line	8	London Underground, Docklands Light Railway	
25	Liverpool Central	3.606	0.172	Liverpool	Merseyrail services (Wirral and Northern lines)	3		
26	Liverpool Lime Street	3.511	0.418	Liverpool	West Coast Main Line; Liverpool to Manchester Lines	10	Merseyrail Wirral line	
27	London Fenchurch Street	3.200	0.396	London	London, Tilbury & Southend Line	4		
28	Romford	3.133	0.223	London	Great Eastern Main Line; Romford to Upminster Line	5	London Overground	
29	Reading	2.963	0.680	Reading	Great Western Main Line	15		
30	Edinburgh Waverley	2.958	0.203	Edinburgh	East Coast Main Line; West Coast Main Line	20	Edinburgh Trams	
31	Willesden Junction	2.796	0.855	London	North London Line; West London Line; Watford DC Line	5	London Underground, London Overground	
32	Richmond	2.699	0.329	London	London Overground	7	London Underground	
33	London Cannon Street	2.684	0.129	London	South Eastern Main Line	7	London Underground	
34	Tottenham Hale	2.652	0.178	London	West Anglia Main Line	3	London Underground	
35	Farringdon	2.643	0.118	London	Thameslink	2	London Underground	
36	Lewisham	2.555	0.564	London	Mid-Kent Line	6	Docklands Light Railway	
37	Ilford	2.536	0.010	London	Great Eastern Main Line	4 (Note: 4 operational; 1 disused)		
38	Seven Sisters	2.359	0.005	London	Lea Valley Lines; West Anglia Main Line	5	London Underground, London Overground	
39	Denmark Hill	2.343	0.182	London	Thameslink; Greenwich Park branch Line; Chatham Main Line; South London Line	4	London Overground	
40	Cambridge	2.301	0.123	Cambridge	West Anglia Main Line	8		
41	Glasgow Queen Street	2.299	0.267	Glasgow	Glasgow to Edinburgh	9	Glasgow Subway (close by)	
42	Shepherd's Bush	2.272	0.004	London	West London Line	2	London Underground (close by), London Overground	
43	Old Street	2.231	0.000	London	Northern City Line	4	London Underground	
44	Waterloo East	2.194	0.255	London	South Eastern Main Line; North Kent Line	4	London Underground (close by)	
45	Dalston Kingsland	2.130	0.000	London	North London Line	2		
46	Blackfriars	2.100	0.581	London	Thameslink	4	London Underground	
47	Ealing Broadway	2.066	0.007	London	Great Western Main Line	9	London Underground	
48	Balham	2.044	0.129	London	Brighton Main Line; Crystal Palace line West London Route	4	London Underground	
49	London Marylebone	2.035	0.111	London	Chiltern Main Line	6	London Underground	
50	Bristol Temple Meads	2.033	0.277	Bristol	South Wales Main Line; Cross Country Route; Wessex Main Line	13		
51	Peckham Rye	2.029	0.725	London	Catford Loop Line; Greenwich Park branch Line; Portsmouth Line; South London Line	4	London Overground	
52	Bromley South	2.025	0.246	London	Chatham Main Line; Maidstone East Line; Bromley South Line; Catford Loop Line	4		
53	Finsbury Park	2.014	0.669	London	Northern City Line; Thameslink	8	London Underground	

Below this, station usage was as follows, per 2020–21 ridership data:

- 90 had reported between 1 and 2 million passengers
- 171 had reported between 500,001 and 1 million passengers
- 333 had reported between 200,001 and 500,000 passengers
- 298 had reported between 100,001 and 200,000 passengers
- 360 had reported between 50,001 and 100,000 passengers
- 713 had reported between 10,001 and 50,000 passengers
- 371 had reported between 1,001 and 10,000 passengers
- 120 had reported between 101 and 1,000 passengers
- 59 stations reported fewer than 100 passengers.

== London terminal ==
This is a list of the busiest stations in the "London terminals" station group.

Rank	Station	Annual entries/exits (millions) 2020–21	Annual interchanges (millions) 2020–21
1	Victoria	13.791	1.385
2	London Bridge	13.764	2.361
3	Waterloo	12.215	1.375
3	Liverpool Street	11.212	1.131
4	Euston	6.607	0.843
5	Paddington	6.392	0.626
6	St Pancras	6.363	0.926
7	Charing Cross	5.373	0.092
8	Vauxhall	4.987	0.000
9	King's Cross	4.668	0.430
10	Fenchurch Street	3.200	0.396
11	Cannon Street	2.684	0.129
12	Farringdon	2.643	0.118
13	Old Street	2.231	0.000
14	Waterloo East	2.194	0.255
15	Blackfriars	2.100	0.581
16	Marylebone	2.035	0.111
17	Moorgate	1.935	0.232
18	City Thameslink	0.974	0.000
19	Elephant & Castle	0.667	0.049

== Other London stations ==
This is a list of the 20 busiest stations in Greater London, excluding those listed above under the London termini.

Rank	Station	Annual entries/exits (millions) 2020–21	Annual interchanges (millions) 2020–21
1	Stratford	13.985	1.746
2	Highbury & Islington	8.661	1.116
3	Clapham Junction	8.371	6.824
4	Barking	6.743	0.263
5	East Croydon	6.695	0.972
6	Canada Water	5.576	0.000
7	Wimbledon	4.433	0.303
8	Whitechapel	4.142	0.000
9	West Ham	4.012	0.003
10	Romford	3.133	0.223
11	Willesden Junction	2.796	0.855
12	Richmond	2.699	0.329
13	Tottenham Hale	2.652	0.178
14	Lewisham	2.555	0.564
15	Ilford	2.536	0.010
16	Seven Sisters	2.359	0.005
17	Denmark Hill	2.343	0.182
18	Shepherd's Bush	2.272	0.004
19	Dalston Kingsland	2.130	0.000
20	Ealing Broadway	2.066	0.007

== Stations outside London ==
This is a list of the 20 busiest stations in Great Britain outside London.

Rank	Railway Station	Annual entries/exits (millions) 2020–21	Annual interchanges (millions) 2020–21
1	Birmingham New Street	7.351	1.024
2	Leeds	5.854	0.545
3	Glasgow Central	5.325	0.761
4	Manchester Piccadilly	5.188	0.374
5	Brighton	4.149	0.367
6	Liverpool Central	3.606	0.172
7	Liverpool Lime Street	3.511	0.418
8	Reading	2.963	0.680
9	Edinburgh Waverley	2.958	0.203
10	Cambridge	2.301	0.123
11	Glasgow Queen Street	2.299	0.267
12	Bristol Temple Meads	2.033	0.277
13	Cardiff Central	1.975	0.240
14	Sheffield	1.907	0.179
15	York	1.837	0.116
16	Coventry	1.747	0.133
17	Chelmsford	1.717	0.011
18	Gatwick Airport	1.686	0.319
19	Watford Junction	1.680	0.091
20	Moorfields	1.613	0.335

== See also ==
- List of busiest railway stations in Great Britain (2021–22)
- List of busiest railway stations in Great Britain (2019–20)
- List of busiest London Underground stations (2020)
- List of busiest railway stations in Europe
- List of busiest railway stations in North America
- List of busiest railway stations in West Yorkshire
