= Station usage in North Yorkshire =

This is a list of railway stations in North Yorkshire, with estimated usage figures gathered from data collected by the Office of Rail and Road (ORR). As of May 2020, there are 58 stations located within North Yorkshire, from which around 23.69 million passenger journeys were made during 2024-2025. There are 48 stations within the area covered by North Yorkshire Council.

Railway station usage in North Yorkshire
Station	Usage ranking	Operated by	Constituency	Journey(s) 2024/2025	Journey(s) 2018–19	Journey(s) 2017–18	Journey(s) 2016–17	Journey(s) 2015–16
York	1	LNER	York Central	10,464,102	9,990,538	9,832,168	9,264,090	8,848,652
Harrogate	2	Northern Trains	Harrogate and Knaresborough	1,879,366	1,661,406	1,697,834	1,649,306	1,558,124
Middlesbrough	3	TransPennine Express	Middlesbrough and Thornaby East	1,543,226	1,289,866	1,312,870	1,356,282	1,331,452
Skipton	4	Northern Trains	Skipton and Ripon	1,286,418	1,217,432	1,206,474	1,137,700	1,090,808
Scarborough	5	TransPennine Express	Scarborough and Whitby	1,001,114	958,026	989,952	979,098	940,706
Northallerton	6	TransPennine Express	Richmond and Northallerton	797,766	717,638	715,256	705,876	688,950
Selby	7	TransPennine Express	Selby	695,840	656,086	650,572	633,430	610,438
Thornaby	8	TransPennine Express	Middlesbrough and Thornaby East	659,752	591,322	602,024	633,960	609,152
Knaresborough	9	Northern Trains	Harrogate and Knaresborough	605,486	410,710	386,062	383,118	349,516
Hornbeam Park	10	Northern Trains	Harrogate and Knaresborough	458.274	397,636	388,238	373,670	352,614
Redcar Central	11	Northern Trains	Redcar	411,366	324,050	344,482	347,570	342,686
Malton	12	TransPennine Express	Thirsk and Malton	375,622	363,136	369,396	353,920	350,424
Saltburn	13	Northern Trains	Redcar	356,108	240,932	237,460	244,258	250,472
Thirsk	14	TransPennine Express	Thirsk and Malton	288,024	230,042	235,438	223,610	218,308
Starbeck	15	Northern Trains	Harrogate and Knaresborough	267,220	206,654	199,984	186,198	172,940
Pannal	16	Northern Trains	Harrogate and Knaresborough	191,634	162,986	158,824	162,026	164,590
Filey	17	Northern Trains	Thirsk and Malton	172,798	105,844	120,534	122,776	119,506
Seamer	18	TransPennine Express	Scarborough and Whitby	164,494	144,668	147,356	137,594	127,816
Church Fenton	19	Northern Trains	Selby and Ainsty	159,050	93,088	75,946	71,180	71,354
Whitby	20	Northern Trains	Scarborough and Whitby	153,478	130,900	138,490	131,810	137,196
Settle	21	Northern Trains	Skipton and Ripon	147,464	139,442	141,342	120,190	132,718
Yarm	22	TransPennine Express	Stockton South	145,970	139,804	149,314	147,058	135,364
South Milford	23	Northern Trains	Selby and Ainsty	135,578	173,438	171,598	156,198	138,458
Sherburn-in-Elmet	24	Northern Trains	Selby and Ainsty	122,098	59,632	51,986	47,488	50,132
Poppleton	25	Northern Trains	York Outer	120,380	70,018	67,734	61,456	64,550
Redcar East	26	Northern Trains	Redcar	106,420	106,250	103,974	114,862	116,230
Cattal	27	Northern Trains	Selby and Ainsty	103,416	61,356	61,406	60,646	60,234
Weeton	28	Northern Trains	Selby and Ainsty	94,500	77,718	79,062	82,462	74,096
Marske	29	Northern Trains	Redcar	62,908	64,460	73,028	74,254	76,030
James Cook	30	Northern Trains	Middlesbrough and Thornaby East	60,804	37,080	33,774	31,402	31,578
Nunthorpe	31	Northern Trains	Redcar	59,464	36,346	34,596	35,814	35,766
Longbeck	32	Northern Trains	Redcar	58,346	47,282	47,240	45,018	43,170
Hammerton	33	Northern Trains	Selby and Ainsty	56,850	28,586	25,824	26,086	25,918
Gypsy Lane	34	Northern Trains	Redcar	44,024	31,204	33,298	32,996	30,338
Hellifield	35	Northern Trains	Skipton and Ripon	42,272	24,490	26,238	26,916	26,896
Bentham	36	Northern Trains	Skipton and Ripon	41,208	26,424	24,148	23,630	22,578
Gargrave	37	Northern Trains	Skipton and Ripon	40,672	30,462	29,898	27,856	26,570
Hunmanby	38	Northern Trains	Thirsk and Malton	40,664	22,704	24,742	23,792	25,116
Ribblehead	39	Northern Trains	Skipton and Ripon	33,682	19,260	21,396	17,734	18,930
Marton	40	Northern Trains	Redcar	32,222	14,774	13,356	13,696	13,512
South Bank	41	Northern Trains	Redcar	29,630	23,282	21,424	23,926	21,846
Horton-in-Ribblesdale	42	Northern Trains	Skipton and Ripon	23,176	18,968	16,720	16,112	16,096
Glaisdale	43	Northern Trains	Scarborough and Whitby	19,420	23,316	20,140	18,298	18,754
Long Preston	44	Northern Trains	Skipton and Ripon	18,214	11,670	11,830	13,070	13,918
Ulleskelf	45	Northern Trains	Selby and Ainsty	16,502	7,256	7,480	8,376	6,910
Giggleswick	46	Northern Trains	Skipton and Ripon	15,486	9,962	10,936	11,408	12,918
Grosmont	47	Northern Trains	Scarborough and Whitby	15,484	12,390	13,912	13,514	15,172
Great Ayton	48	Northern Trains	Richmond	13,508	7,726	7,322	6,890	7,100
Egton	49	Northern Trains	Scarborough and Whitby	10,100	11,698	12,878	12,088	13,724
Clapham	50	Northern Trains	Skipton and Ripon	9,690	6,576	6,688	7,442	6,654
Danby	51	Northern Trains	Scarborough and Whitby	8,520	6,184	6,810	6,334	7,084
Lealholm	52	Northern Trains	Scarborough and Whitby	6,868	15,250	16,298	17,358	18,102
Sleights	53	Northern Trains	Scarborough and Whitby	6,848	4,182	4,254	4,188	4,122
Castleton Moor	54	Northern Trains	Scarborough and Whitby	6,688	4,928	6,182	5,444	4,930
Ruswarp	55	Northern Trains	Scarborough and Whitby	4,112	2,404	2,686	2,568	2,966
Battersby	56	Northern Trains	Richmond	2,524	1,520	1,564	1,660	1,458
Commondale	57	Northern Trains	Scarborough and Whitby	2,120	2,344	1,888	3,754	5,232
Kildale	58	Northern Trains	Richmond	1,672	1,468	1,630	1,416	1,610

== Gallery ==
Railway stations in North Yorkshire
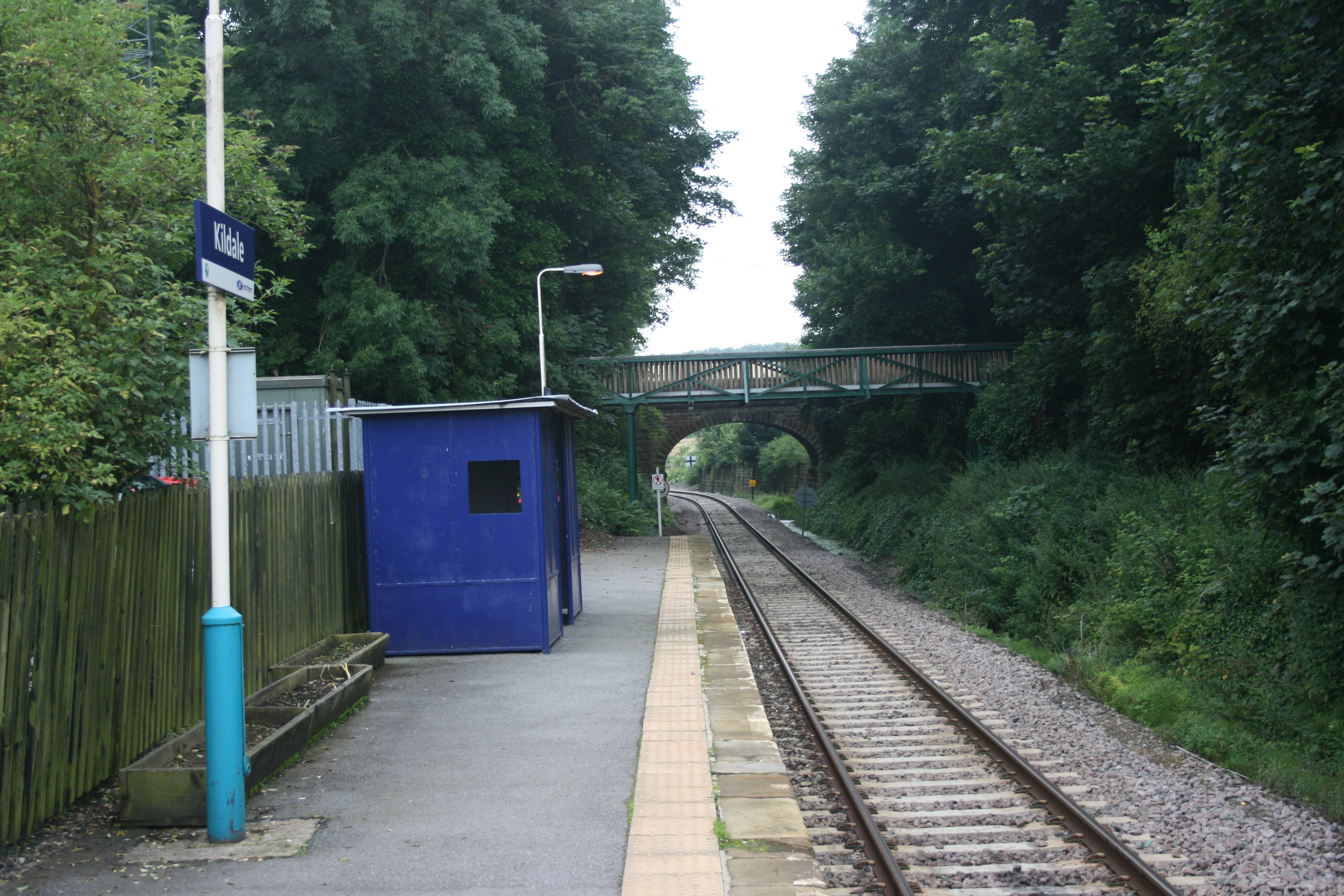
Kildale, on the Esk Valley Line, is the least-used station in North Yorkshire.

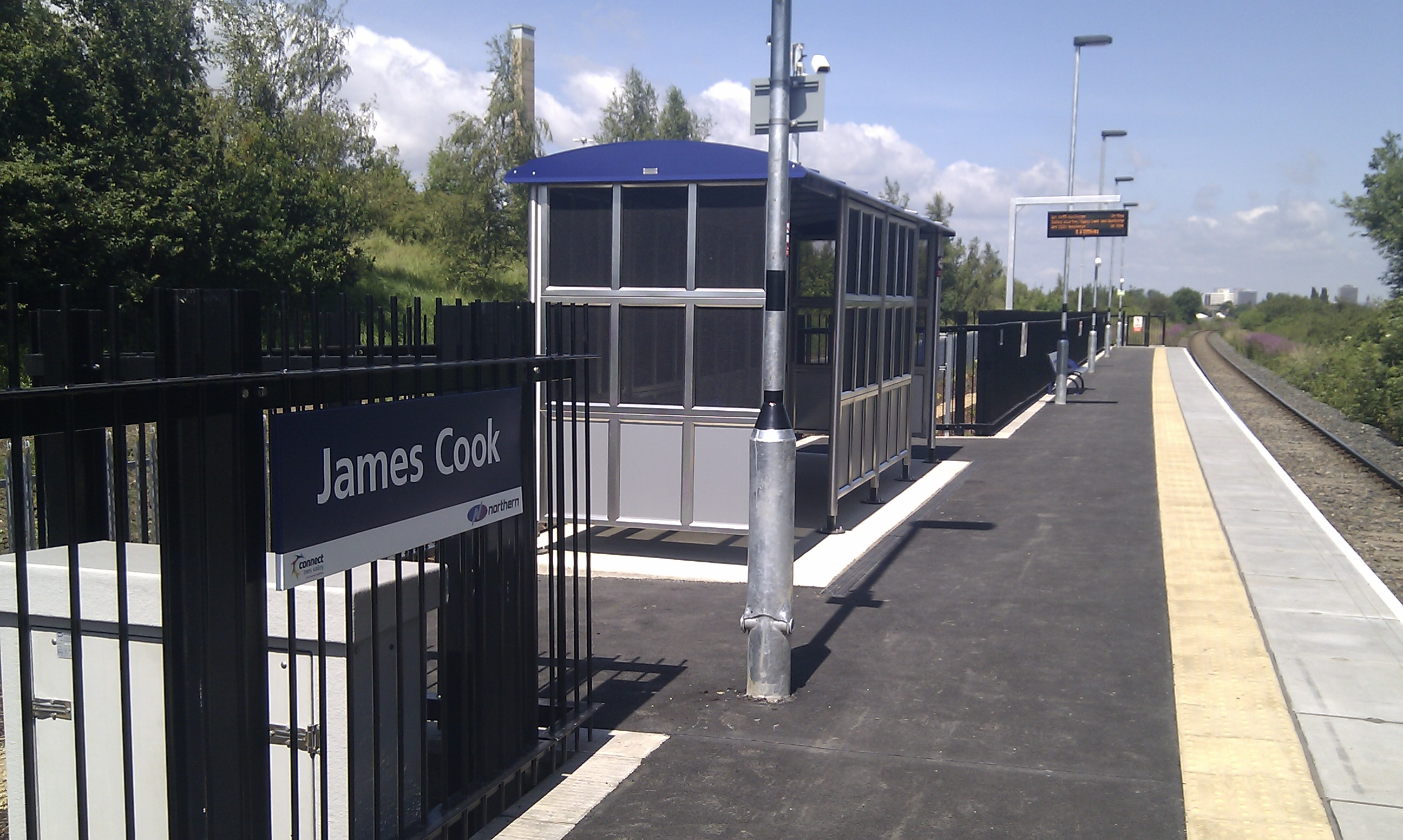
James Cook opened in May 2014, and is the newest station is North Yorkshire.

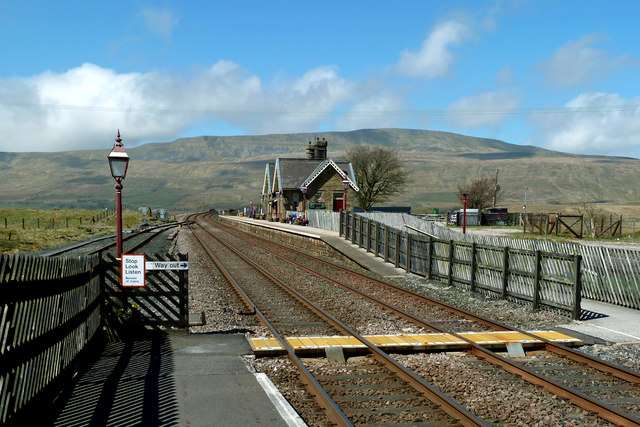
The station at Ribblehead is located to the south of the Ribblehead Viaduct.

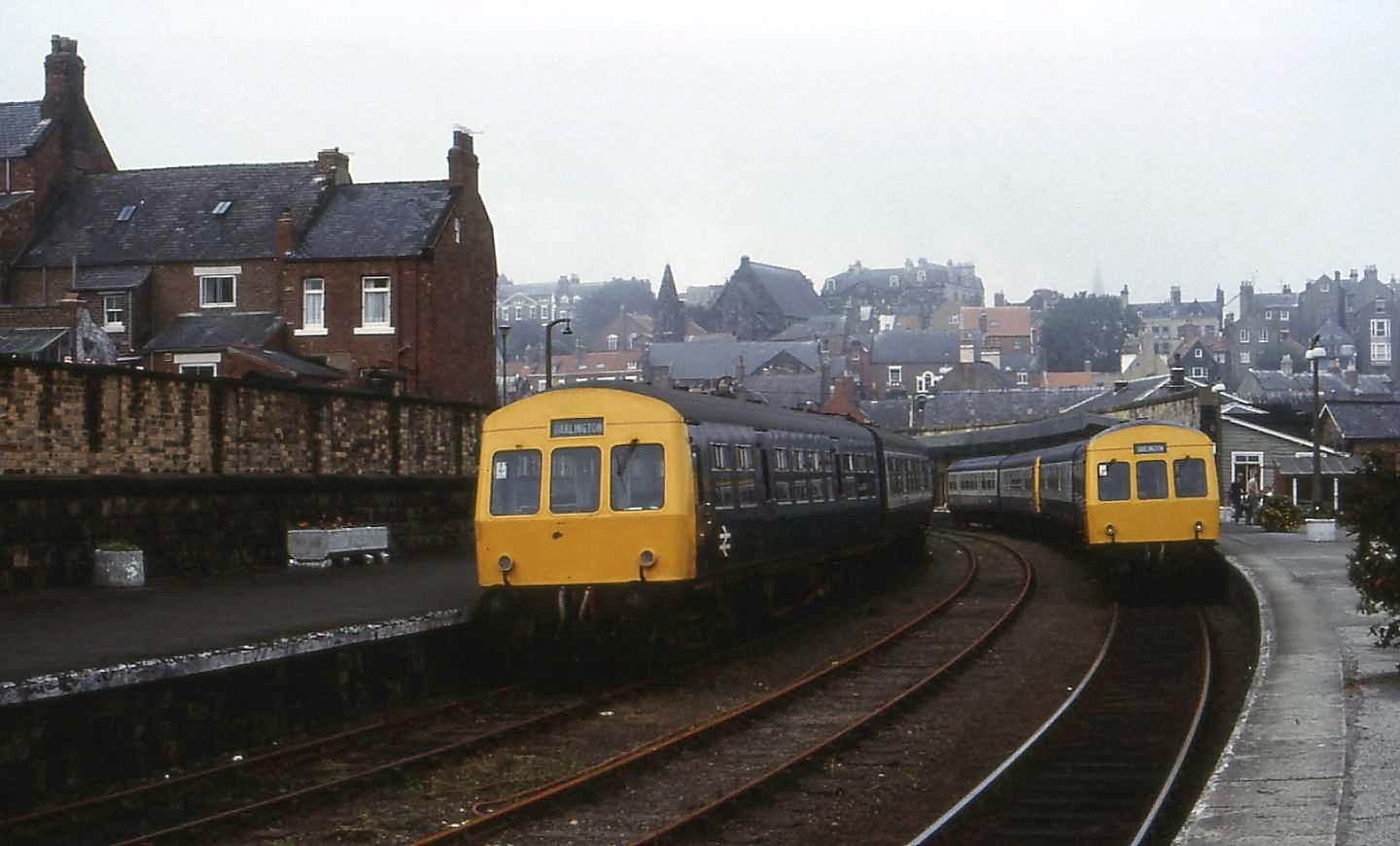
The station at Whitby (formerly Whitby Town) dates back to June 1835.

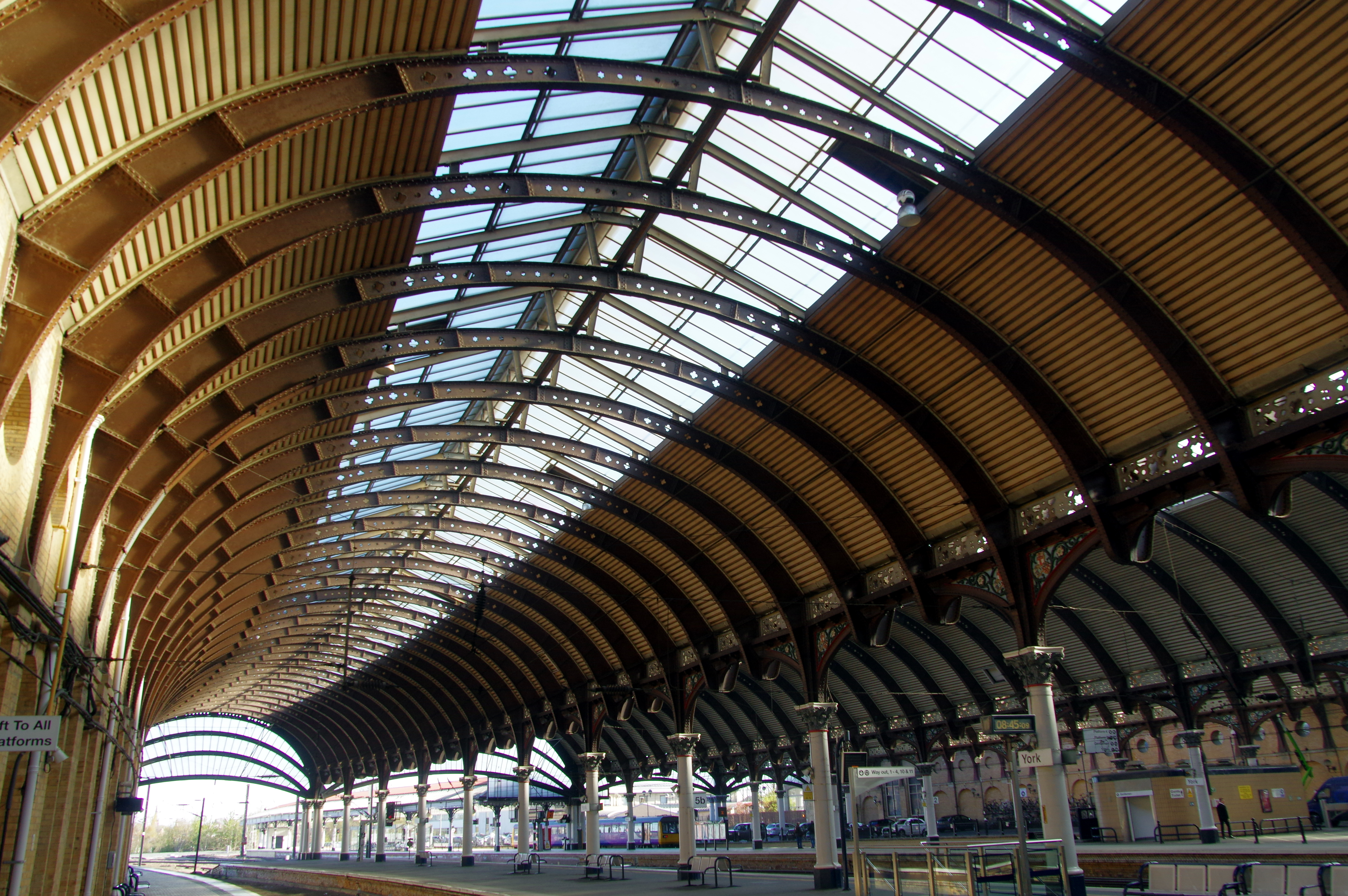
York, on the East Coast Main Line, is the most-used station in North Yorkshire.

== See also ==
- List of busiest railway stations in Great Britain
