= List of busiest railway stations =

This is a list of railway stations serving more than 30 million passengers per year.

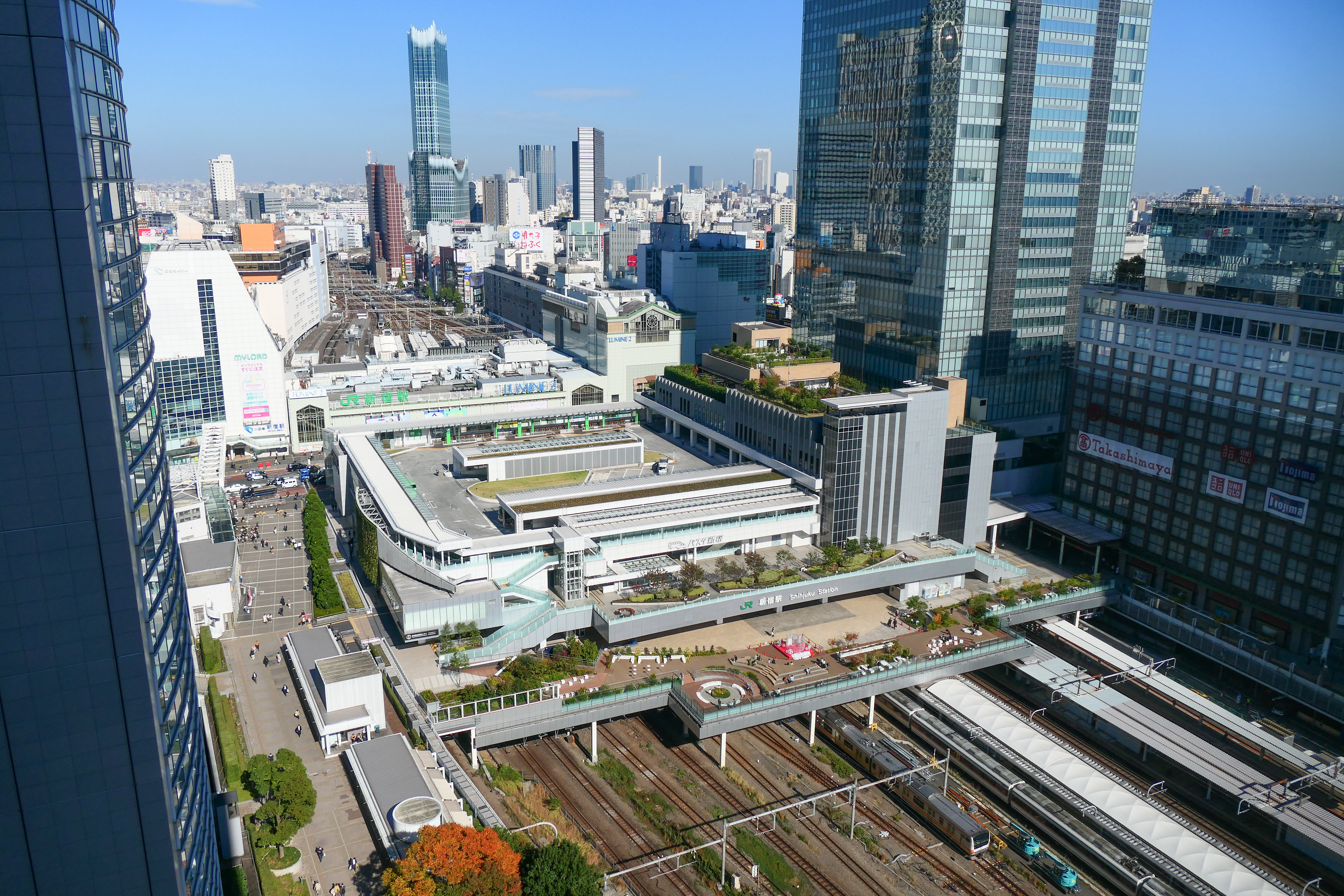
Shinjuku Station in Tokyo, Japan is the busiest railway station in the world, with more than 1.1 billion passengers in 2023

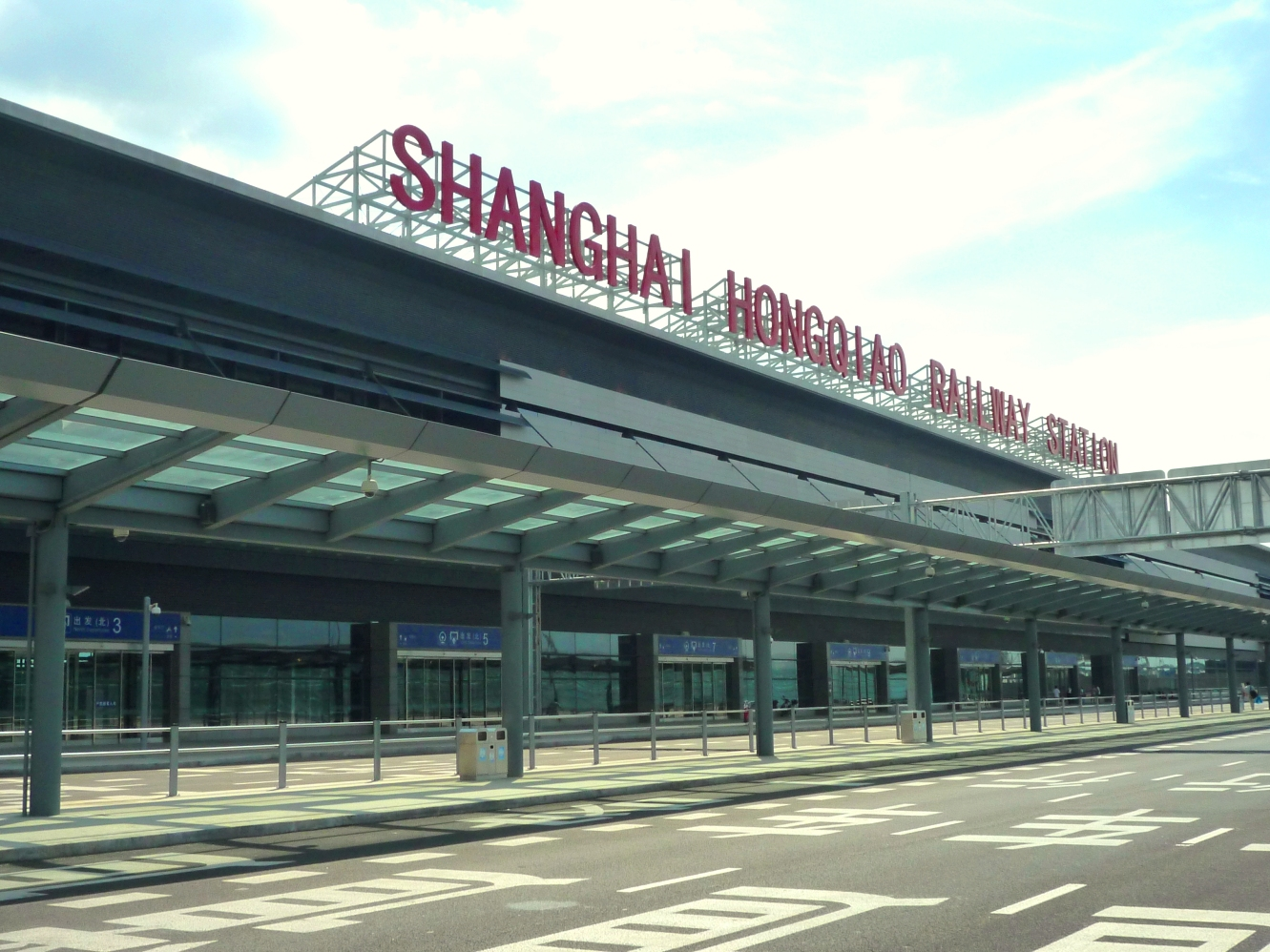
Shanghai Hongqiao railway station in Shanghai, China is the busiest railway station outside Japan

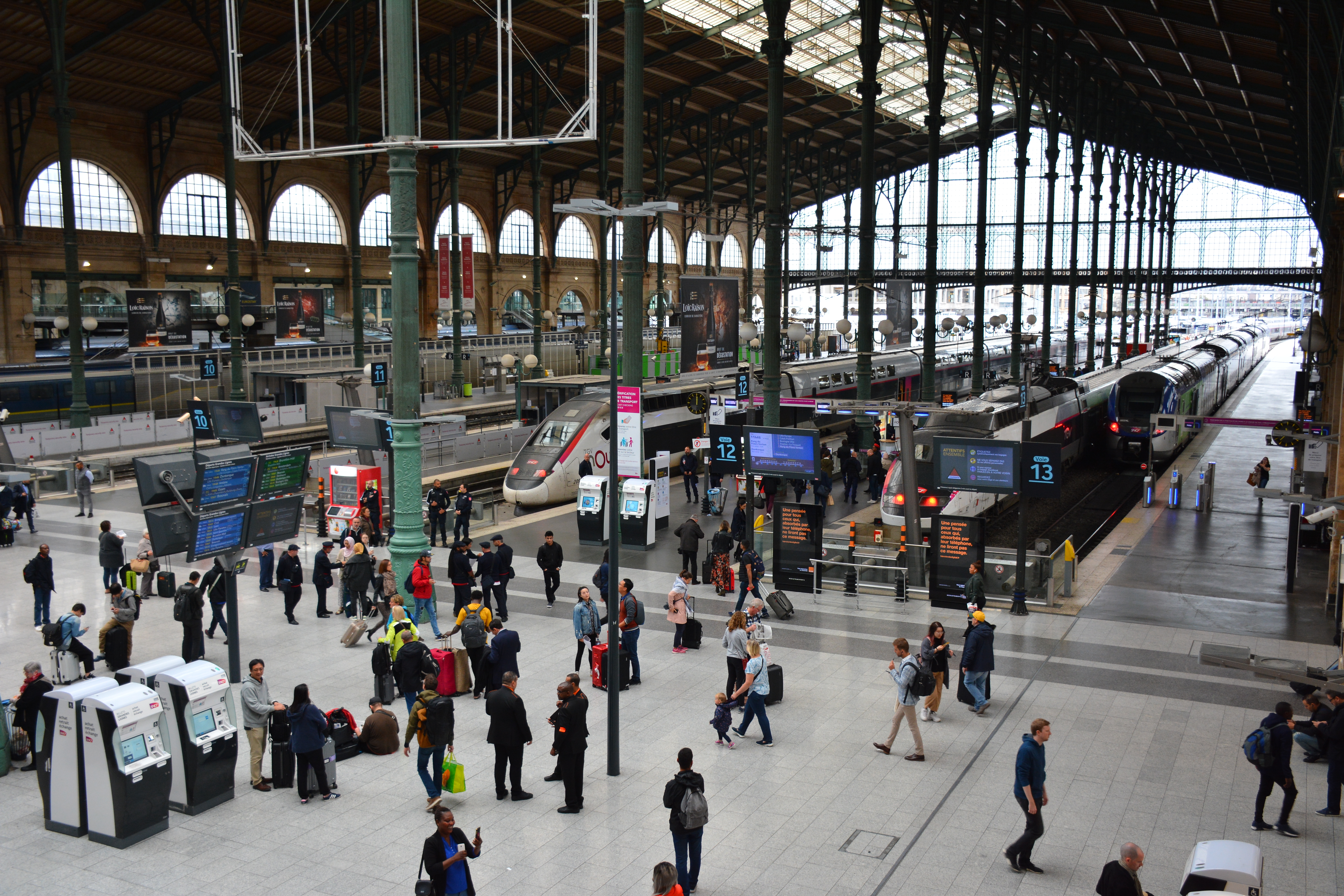
Gare du Nord in Paris, France, the busiest railway station in Europe

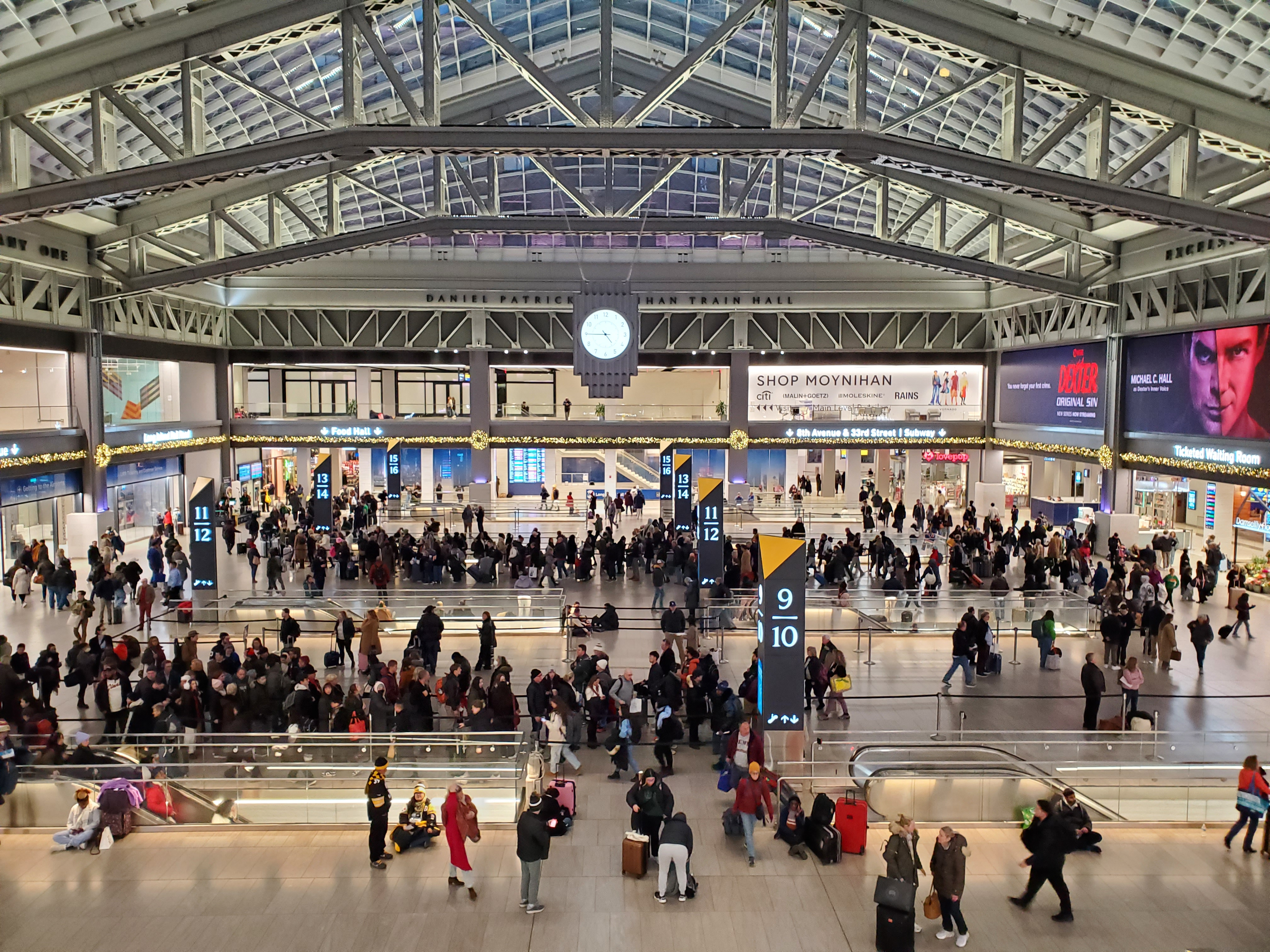
New York Penn Station in the United States is the busiest railway station in the Americas

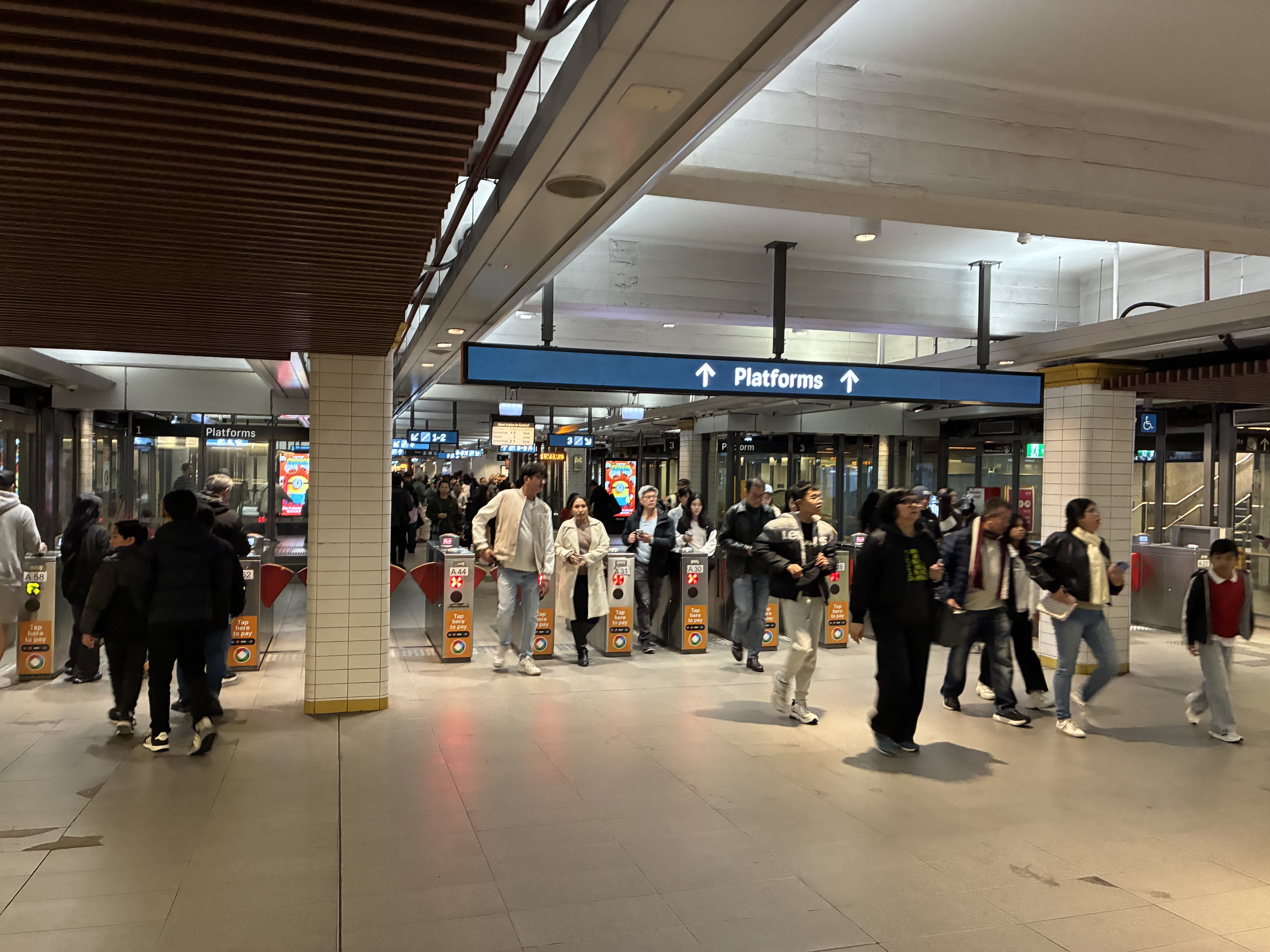
Town Hall station in Sydney is Australia's busiest railway station and the busiest station in Oceania

Country	City	Railway station	Passengers (millions per year)				Platforms	Sourced data year
Country	City	Railway station	All modes	Rapid Transit	Commuter	Long distance	Platforms	Sourced data year
Japan	Tokyo	Shinjuku Station	1163.7	234.5	929.2		16	2023–2024
Japan	Tokyo	Shibuya Station	1023.3				12	2023
Japan	Tokyo	Ikebukuro Station	842.5				26	2023
Japan	Osaka	Ōsaka / Umeda Station	750.4				29	2023
Japan	Yokohama	Yokohama Station	710.5				17	2023
Japan	Tokyo	Kita-Senju Station	506.7				14	2023
Japan	Tokyo	Tokyo Station	433.3	68.2	248.0	117.2	29	2023–2024
Japan	Nagoya	Nagoya Station	422.9	144.4	230.2	48.3	22	2023–2024
Japan	Tokyo	Shinagawa Station	302.7		279.2	23.4	22	2023–2024
Japan	Tokyo	Takadanobaba Station	286.0				7	2023
Japan	Tokyo	Shimbashi Station	281.8				14	2023
France	Paris	Gare du Nord	257	51.1	47.4		30	2024
Japan	Osaka	Namba Station	253.8				15	2023
China	Shanghai	Shanghai Hongqiao	250.44	112.8		137.64	36	2019
China	Beijing	Beijing South Station	241				22	2024
Japan	Saitama	Ōmiya Station	239.9	17.3	247.9	22.2	22	2023–2024
Japan	Tokyo	Akihabara Station	236.5				10	2023
Japan	Osaka	Tennōji Station	235.1				17	2023
Japan	Tokyo	Meguro Station	232.4				4	2023
Japan	Tokyo	Oshiage Station	224.3				8	2023
Japan	Kyoto	Kyōto Station	221.8	46.6	147.0	27.8	15	2023–2024
Japan	Kobe	Sannomiya Station	217.6				11	2023
Taiwan	Taipei	Taipei Main Station	209.6	130.4	44.7	34.5	16	2024-2025
Japan	Funabashi	Nishi-Funabashi Station	209.2				12	2023
China	Guangzhou	Tiyu Xilu Station	203.2	203.2			6	2019
Japan	Tokyo	Ueno Station	201.5	66.0	127.0	8.5	24	2023–2024
Germany	Hamburg	Hamburg Central Station	196	59.5	94.5		20	2019
Japan	Tokyo	Yoyogi-Uehara Station	191.5				4	2023
Germany	Frankfurt am Main	Frankfurt (Main) Central Station	179.9				34	2019
Japan	Kawasaki	Kawasaki Station	178.0				6	2022
United Kingdom	London	Waterloo	177.1	82.9	94.2		32	2018–2019
China	Guangzhou	Guangzhou South Station	176.6			176.6	28	2024
Japan	Tokyo	Yūrakuchō / Hibiya Station	173.8				12	2023
Japan	Funabashi	Funabashi Station	164.9				6	2023
Japan	Machida	Machida Station	164.6				8	2023
Sweden	Stockholm	Stockholm City/T-Centralen	163.8	124.6	39.2		10	2018
Japan	Tokyo	Hamamatsuchō / Daimon Station	160.3				8	2023
United Kingdom	London	Victoria	160.2	85.5	74.7		23	2018–2019
Japan	Osaka	Shin-Ōsaka Station	159.5	51.2	50.5	57.8	20	2023–2024
Switzerland	Zurich	Zürich Central Station	164.2				26	2025
Japan	Fukuoka	Hakata Station	152.5				18	2023
Germany	Munich	München Central Station	150.7				32	2019
Japan	Tokyo	Ōtemachi Station	150.5				10	2023
France	Paris	Gare de Lyon	150.2	36.5	37.5		28	2019
Italy	Rome	Termini Station	150				32	2017
Japan	Kawasaki	Musashi-Kosugi Station	149.8				8	2023
China	Hangzhou	Hangzhou East Station	146.7				30	2024
China	Guangzhou	Zhujiang New Town Station	146.7	146.7			4	2019
Japan	Tokyo	Nakano Station	141.1				8	2023
Japan	Tokyo	Kamata Station	140.6				8	2023
China	Guangzhou	Jiahewanggang Station	140.4	140.4			6	2019
Japan	Musashino	Kichijōji Station	137.4				6	2023
Japan	Tokyo	Ōsaki Station	137.2				8	2023
United Kingdom	London	Liverpool Street	136.7	67.2	69.5		23	2018–2019
Japan	Tokyo	Ayase Station	136.0				5	2023
United Kingdom	London	London Bridge	135.6	74.3	61.3		19	2018–2019
Japan	Tachikawa	Tachikawa Station	135.6				8	2023
Japan	Nagoya	Kanayama Station	135.4				12	2023
Japan	Kashiwa	Kashiwa Station	134.8				8	2023
Japan	Tokyo	Gotanda Station	133.2				6	2023
Japan	Tokyo	Naka-Meguro Station	132.8				4	2023
Japan	Yokohama	Shin-Yokohama Station	131.0	25.6	80.5	24.9	12	2023–2024
Japan	Fujisawa	Fujisawa Station	130.5				9	2023
Japan	Tokyo	Nishi-Nippori Station	130.5				8	2023
Japan	Tokyo	Sengakuji Station	128.3				4	2022
Japan	Tokyo	Ōimachi Station	127.4				6	2023
Japan	Tokyo	Ebisu Station	124.3				6	2023
Japan	Tokyo	Tamachi / Mita Station	123.4				8	2023
Japan	Osaka	Tsuruhashi Station	121.3				8	2023
Japan	Wakō	Wakōshi Station	120.9				4	2023
China	Shenzhen	Gangxia North Station	120.5+	120.5+			8	2023
Germany	Berlin	Berlin Central Station	120.1				16	2019
Italy	Milan	Milan Central Station	120				24	2017
Japan	Tokyo	Jimbōchō Station	119.9				6	2023
Japan	Osaka	Kyōbashi Station	119.5				10	2023
Spain	Madrid	Atocha Station	116.6		94.6	22.1	24	2017
Germany	Cologne	Köln Central Station	116.1				11	2019
China	Shenzhen	Shenzhen North Station	116			116	20	2024
Japan	Tokyo	Ichigaya Station	113.8				8	2023
Japan	Tokyo	Iidabashi Station	113.1				12	2023
Japan	Kokubunji	Kokubunji Station	111.8				6	2023
Japan	Kawasaki	Noborito Station	111.1				7	2023
Japan	Tokyo	Kotake-mukaihara Station	110.0				4	2023
Japan	Tokyo	Nippori Station	109.9				9	2023
China	Chengdu	Chengdu East Station	109.5				26	2024
China	Guangzhou	Guangzhou Station	109.5				9	2024
United States	New York City	New York Penn Station	125.8 (Note: Total is derived by adding up passengers on LIRR, NJ Transit and Amtrak. LIRR 2017 Totals breaks down as follows: 117180 daily weekday arrivals, 116160 daily weekday departures, 48960 Saturday arrivals, 48470 Saturday departures, 36950 Sunday arrivals, 40700 Sunday departures. This gives us a yearly total of ((117180+116160)*5+(48960+48470)+(36950+40700))*52 = 69,722,560. NJ Transit 2017 Totals breaks down as follows: 93,305 weekday arrivals and departures from Penn Station. Breakdown for Saturday and Sunday is not given but it can be calculated by looking at the percentage drop in total ridership. 307853 total trips took place on NJ Transit on a weekday, 104088 took place on Saturday and 87709 on Sunday. Which means ridership on Saturday is 33.8% that of an average weekday and ridership on Sunday is 28.5% that of a weekday. Which gives (93305*0.338) = 31547 arrivals and departures from Penn Station on Saturday and (93305*0.285) = 26853 arrivals and departures from Penn Station Sunday. Giving us a yearly total of ((93305*5)+31547+26853)*52 = 27,296,100. Amtrak 2017 total is: 10,397,729. Totaling up these 3 figures gives us: 69,722,560+27,296,100+10,397,729 = 107,416,389)	18.4	94.4	13.0	29	2017
France	Paris	Gare Saint-Lazare	107.3	46.9			27	2019
Japan	Osaka	Yodoyabashi Station	107.3				6	2023
United Kingdom	London	Stratford	106.1	64.9	41.2		18	2018–2019
Japan	Sendai	Sendai Station	105.6	40.1	47.4	18.1	14	2023–2024
Japan	Tokyo	Kinshichō Station	105.1				4	2023
United Kingdom	London	Bank & Monument	103.7				10	2024
Japan	Tokyo	Yotsuya Station	103.4				8	2023
Japan	Tokyo	Shin-Kiba Station	103.3				6	2023
South Korea	Seoul	Seoul Station	101.9	70.8		31.2	15	2023-2024
Japan	Yokohama	Totsuka Station	101.1				6	2023
Germany	Berlin	Berlin Friedrichstraße	95.6				8	2019
Germany	Hannover	Hannover Hbf	95.3				12	2019
China	Nanjing	Nanjing South Station	93.3				28	2024
Germany	Stuttgart	Stuttgart Hbf	93.1				17	2019
India	Thane	Thane Station	93.067				10	2023-24
Germany	Berlin	Berlin Ostkreuz	91.3				12	2019
Germany	Düsseldorf	Düsseldorf Hbf	89.8				20	2019
Indonesia	Jakarta	Manggarai	84.3				10	2024
India	Kalyan	Kalyan Junction	83.792				8	2023-24
China	Nanchang	Nanchang West Station	81				22	2024
Russia	Moscow	Moscow Yaroslavsky	78.6		71.8	6.8	16	2019
China	Shanghai	Shanghai Station	77.3				13	2024
Germany	Nuremberg	Nürnberg Hbf	76.7				21	2019
Netherlands	Utrecht	Utrecht Centraal	75.7				16	2019
Germany	Berlin	Berlin Gesundbrunnen	74.1				10	2019
China	Lanzhou	Lanzhou West Station	73				24	2024
Netherlands	Amsterdam	Amsterdam Centraal	72.8				11	2019
Canada	Toronto	Toronto Union Station	72.4				16	2024
Russia	Moscow	Moscow Kursky	71.1		58.3	12.8	17	2019
Malaysia	Kuala Lumpur	Kuala Lumpur Sentral Station	70.8				12	2024
Italy	Turin	Torino Porta Nuova	70				20	2017
France	Paris	Gare Montparnasse	68.9	29.9			28	2024
United States	New York City	Grand Central Terminal	67.3				60	2024
United Kingdom	London	London Paddington	66.9	48.6			21	2023–2024
China	Changsha	Changsha South Station	66.1				24	2024
Germany	Berlin	Berlin Südkreuz	65.3				10	2019
Switzerland	Bern	Bern	65.1 (Note: w/o figures from RBS)				17	2024
United Kingdom	London	Tottenham Court Road	64.2				6	2023–2024
Germany	Munich	München Ostbf	63.5				14	2019
India	Howrah	Howrah Station	61.329				24	2023-24
United States	New York City	Jamaica Station	59.803				10	2024
Germany	Munich	München Marienplatz	59.5				2	2019
Italy	Florence	Firenze Santa Maria Novella	59				19	2024
Italy	Bologna	Bologna Centrale	58				28	2024
Indonesia	Jakarta	Tanah Abang	56.6				7	2024
Germany	Essen	Essen Hbf	55.5				13	2019
Germany	Berlin	Berlin Alexanderplatz	55.5				4	2019
Norway	Oslo	Oslo sentralstasjon	54.8				19	2024
China	Suzhou	Suzhou Station	54.7				14	2024
Germany	Bremen	Bremen Hbf	53.7				9	2019
India	Mumbai	Mumbai CSMT	51.652				18	2023-24
India	Kolkata	Sealdah Station	51.369				21	2023-24
Italy	Rome	Roma Tiburtina	51				20	2024
China	Beijing	Beijing West Station	50.8				20	2024
Germany	Munich	München-Pasing	50.7				9	2019
Germany	Hamburg	Hamburg-Altona	50.4				12	2019
China	Xiamen	Xiamen North Station	50				10	2024
Italy	Naples	Napoli Centrale	50				25	2024
Russia	Moscow	Moscow Kazansky	49.9		33.5	16.4	17	2019
Denmark	Copenhagen	Københavns Hovedbanegård	49.5	8.9	17.7	31.7	15	2024
Germany	Leipzig	Leipzig Hbf	49.3				21	2019
Australia	Sydney	Town Hall Station	48.5				6	2024
China	Xian	Xian Station	48				16	2024
Germany	Duisburg	Duisburg Hbf	47.5				12	2019
Germany	Berlin	Berlin Zoologischer Garten	47.4				6	2024
India	Panvel	Panvel Station	46.258				7	2023-24
United Kingdom	London	Farringdon	46				6	2023–2024
Austria	Vienna	Wien Hbf	45.4				12	2024
Finland	Helsinki	Helsingin päärautatieasema	45.1		38.7	6.4	19	2019
Australia	Sydney	Sydney Central Station	45.1				27	2024
China	Urumqi	Urumqi Station	45				16	2024
Germany	Dortmund	Dortmund Hbf	44.9				16	2019
China	Shenyang	Shenyang North Station	44.2				14	2024
China	Xi'an	Xi'an North Station	44.1				34	2024
China	Jinan	Jinan West Station	43.9				15	2024
United States	Chicago	Chicago Union Station	43.9				31	2024
Germany	Mannheim	Mannheim Hbf	43.1			8	11	2024
Germany	Braunschweig	Braunschweig Hbf	43.1	40.8			9	2019
France	Paris	Gare de l'Est	42.7	22.4			29	2024
France	Lyon	Lyon-Part-Dieu	42.4				12	2024
Bangladesh	Dhaka	Kamalapur Station	42				9	2024
France	Juvisy-sur-Orge	Juvisy	41.9				13	2024
Spain	Barcelona	Barcelona Sants	40.8		30.3	10.5	14	2022
Russia	Moscow	Moscow Leningradsky	39.7		27.6	12.1	10	2019
India	Delhi	New Delhi Station	39.632				16	2023-24
France	Paris	Magenta	38.8				4	2024
United Kingdom	London	Bond Street	38.3				6	2023–2024
France	Paris	Haussmann–Saint-Lazare	38.3				4	2024
Argentina	Buenos Aires	Plaza Constitución	38.1		37.7	0.4	16	2022
Switzerland	Lucerne	Luzern	37.9				14	2024
Switzerland	Lausanne	Lausanne	37.6				10	2024
Switzerland	Winterthur	Winterthur	37.3				9	2024
Netherlands	Rotterdam	Rotterdam Centraal	37.1				13	2019
Belgium	Brussels	Bruxelles-Midi/Brussel-Zuid	37				22	2024
France	Saint-Denis	Saint-Denis	37				6	2024
Switzerland	Basel	Basel SBB	36.8 (Note: w/o SNCF figures)				23	2024
Germany	Berlin	Berlin Ostbahnhof	36.5				9	2024
United Kingdom	London	London Euston	36.2	41.1			24	2023–2024
Germany	Stuttgart	Stuttgart Stadtmitte	36.1				2	2019
Netherlands	The Hague	Den Haag Centraal	36.1				12	2019
United Kingdom	London	London St Pancras	36	44.9			15	2023–2024
Netherlands	Haarlemmermeer	Schiphol Airport	35.8				6	2019
Germany	Frankfurt am Main	Frankfurt (Main) Konstablerwache	35.8				2	2019
Belgium	Brussels	Bruxelles-Central/Brussel-Centraal	35.8				6	2024
United Kingdom	London	Whitechapel	35.2				6	2023–2024
Belgium	Brussels	Bruxelles-Nord/Brussel-Noord	35.2				12	2024
China	Zhengzhou	Zhengzhou Station	35				13	2024
Germany	Frankfurt am Main	Frankfurt (Main) Hauptwache	35				2	2019
China	Beijing	Beijing Station	34.7				14	2024
Austria	Vienna	Wien Meidling	33.9				8	2024
China	Suzhou	Suzhou North Station	33.5				4	2024
United Kingdom	Birmingham	Birmingham New Street	33.3				12	2023–2024
China	Changchun	Changchun Station	33.2				16	2024
Italy	Milan	Milano Cadorna	33.1				10	2024
China	Guiyang	Guiyang North Station	32.8				28	2024
India	Tambaram	Tambaram Station	32.785				10	2023-24
India	Mumbai	Dadar Station	32.269				14	2023-24
United States	Chicago	Ogilvie Transportation Center	31.9				16	2024
Indonesia	Bogor	Bogor	31.8				8	2024
France	Puteaux	La Défense	31.7				10	2024
France	Aulnay-sous-Bois	Aulnay-sous-Bois	31.7				5	2024
Switzerland	Zürich	Zürich Oerlikon	31				8	2024
Italy	Venice	Venezia Mestre	31				13	2024
Germany	Berlin	Berlin-Lichtenberg	31				8	2024
Poland	Kraków	Kraków Główny	30.76				10	2026
Denmark	Copenhagen	Nørreport	30.6	25.2	24.4	6.2	4	2024
India	Chennai	MGR Chennai Central	30.595				17	2023-24
Spain	Madrid	Madrid Nuevos Ministerios	30.5		30.5		6	2022
Belgium	Ghent	Gent-Sint-Pieters	30.5				12	2024
Czechia	Prague	Praha hlavní nádraží	30.2				16	2017
Netherlands	Leiden	Leiden Centraal	30.2				6	2019
Italy	Venice	Venezia Santa Lucia	30				16	2024

== See also ==
- List of busiest railway stations in Europe
- List of busiest railway stations in North America
- List of busiest London Underground stations
- List of busiest railway stations in West Yorkshire
- List of busiest railway stations in Belgium
- List of busiest railway stations in Switzerland
- List of busiest railway stations in Austria
- List of busiest railway stations in Russia
- List of busiest railway stations in Taiwan
- List of busiest railway stations in Germany
- List of busiest railway stations in Poland
- List of busiest railway stations in France
- List of busiest railway stations in the Netherlands
- List of busiest railway stations in Great Britain
