= List of busiest railway stations in Great Britain (2019–20) =

This is a list of the busiest railway stations in Great Britain on the National Rail network for the 1 April 2019 to 31 March 2020 financial year. The dataset for the year was the last to show typical patterns of mobility prior to the COVID-19 pandemic in the United Kingdom, with many major stations falling down the ranking the following year. During 2019–20 there were 1,739 million passenger journeys on the network. London Waterloo was the busiest station during the year, marking 16 years at the top of the ranking.

== Methodology ==
The figures are collected by the Office of Rail and Road, and are estimates based on ticket usage data use of an Origin Destination Matrix, a comprehensive matrix of rail flows between stations throughout Great Britain in the financial year of 2019–20. The data count entries and exits at any station. Only tickets sold for National Rail services are included. As such, London Underground, special tours, local light rail and heritage railway tickets are excluded. Note that the data covers mainland Great Britain and surrounding small islands (such as the Isle of Wight), not the United Kingdom, and so exclude tickets within Northern Ireland and Eurostar. There are various further limits to the data due to the variety of ticketing options available on rail services within the UK; these are outlined in full in the report on the data. Data for 2019–20 was published on 1 December 2020.

== All stations ==
Only stations with annual entries and exits above 10 million passengers are shown.

Rank	Railway station	Annual entries/exits (millions) 2019-20	Annual interchanges (millions) 2019-20	Location	Main services	Number of platforms	Interchange systems	Image
1	London Waterloo	86.904	6.310	London	South West Main Line; West of England Main Line	24 (Note: Platforms 25 and 26 are part of the Underground)	London Underground	
2	London Victoria	73.559	5.756	London	Brighton Main Line; Chatham Main Line	19	London Underground	
3	London Liverpool Street	65.985	4.351	London	Great Eastern Main Line; West Anglia Main Line	18	London Underground, London Overground, TfL Rail	
4	London Bridge	63.095	10.678	London	South Eastern Main Line; Brighton Main Line; Thameslink	15	London Underground	
5	Birmingham New Street	46.511	6.994	Birmingham	West Coast Main Line; Cross Country Route	13	West Midlands Metro	
6	London Paddington	44.87	2.98	London	Great Western Main Line; South Wales Main Line; Reading to Plymouth Line	13 (Note: Platforms 15 and 16 are part of the Underground, platform 13 closed)	London Underground, TfL Rail	
7	London Euston	44.777	4.357	London	West Coast Main Line	18	London Underground, London Overground	
8	Stratford	41.912	4.882	London	Great Eastern Main Line; Lea Valley Lines	9 (Note: 4 and 7 disused, 3A, 4A, 4B, and 10A exist)	London Underground, Docklands Light Railway, London Overground, TfL Rail	
9	London St Pancras International	36.040	4.777	London	Midland Main Line; Thameslink; Eurostar; South Eastern High Speed	15	London Underground	
10	London King's Cross	32.532	2.412	London	East Coast Main Line	11 (Note: Starts at 0)	London Underground	
11	Glasgow Central	32.465	-	Glasgow	West Coast Main Line	17	Glasgow Subway	
12	Manchester Piccadilly	32.199	-	Manchester	West Coast Main Line	14	Manchester Metrolink	
13	Leeds	31.021	-	Leeds	East Coast Main Line; Midland Main Line; Cross Country Route	18		
14	Highbury and Islington	29.399	3.397	London	North London Line; East London Line Northern City Line	8	London Underground, London Overground	
15	London Charing Cross	28.344	0.833	London	South Eastern Main Line	6	London Underground	
16	Clapham Junction	28.892	26.903	London	South West Main Line; West of England Main Line; Brighton Main Line	17	London Overground	
17	East Croydon	25.006	5.463	London	Brighton Main Line	6	Croydon Tramlink	
18	Edinburgh Waverley	23.088	1.792	Edinburgh	East Coast Main Line	20 (16 tracks)	Edinburgh Trams	
19	Canada Water	24.997	<0.001	London	East London Line	4	London Underground	
20	Gatwick Airport	21.051	1.527	Gatwick Airport	Brighton Main Line; Gatwick Express	7		
21	Vauxhall	19.997	-	London	South West Main Line	8	London Underground	
22	London Cannon Street	18.513	-	London	South Eastern Main Line	7	London Underground	
23	London Fenchurch Street	17.717	-	London	London, Tilbury & Southend Line	4		
24	Brighton	17.356	1.660	Brighton	Brighton Main Line; West Coastway Line	8	East Coastway Line	
25	Wimbledon	17.282	1.076	London	South West Main Line	10 (Note: 10a and 10b are Croydon Tramlink)	London Underground, Croydon Tramlink	
26	Reading	16.753	-	Reading	Great Western Main Line	15		
27	Glasgow Queen Street	16.686	-	Glasgow	Glasgow to Edinburgh	9	Glasgow Subway	
28	Farringdon	16.497	0.399	London	Thameslink	2	London Underground	
29	Liverpool Central	16.455	0.649	Liverpool	Merseyrail services (Wirral and Northern lines)	3		
30	Liverpool Lime Street	16.022	1.190	Liverpool	West Coast Main Line; Liverpool to Manchester Lines	10	Merseyrail Wirral line	
31	London Marylebone	15.796	0.853	London	Chiltern Main Line	6	London Underground	
32	Barking	13.831	0.627	London	London, Tilbury and Southend line	9	London Underground	
33	Whitechapel	13.831	0.627	London	London Overground	4	London Underground	
34	Blackfriars	12.993	2.932	London	Thameslink	4	London Underground	
35	Cardiff Central	12.671	2.033	Cardiff	South Wales Main Line	8		
36	Bristol Temple Meads	11.619	1.632	Bristol	South Wales Main Line; Cross Country Route; Wessex Main Line	13		
37	Cambridge	11.600	0.627	Cambridge	West Anglia Main Line	8		
38	Richmond	11.003	1.539	London	London Overground	7	London Underground	
39	West Ham	10.181	-	London	London, Tilbury and Southend line	8	London Underground	
40	Sheffield	10.095	1.050	Sheffield	Cross Country Route; Midland Main Line	9	Sheffield Supertram	
41	York	10.085	0.775	York	Cross Country Route; East Coast Main Line	11		
42	Waterloo East	10.075	0.863	London	South Eastern Main Line; North Kent Line	4	London Underground (close by)	
43	Lewisham	10.005	2.564	London	Mid-Kent Line	6	Docklands Light Railway	

== See also ==
- List of busiest railway stations in Great Britain (2020–21)
- List of busiest railway stations in Great Britain (2021–22)
- List of busiest London Underground stations
- List of busiest railway stations in Europe
- List of busiest railway stations in North America
- List of busiest railway stations in West Yorkshire
