= Stuttgart Stadtmitte station =

Railway station in Germany

Stuttgart Stadtmitte
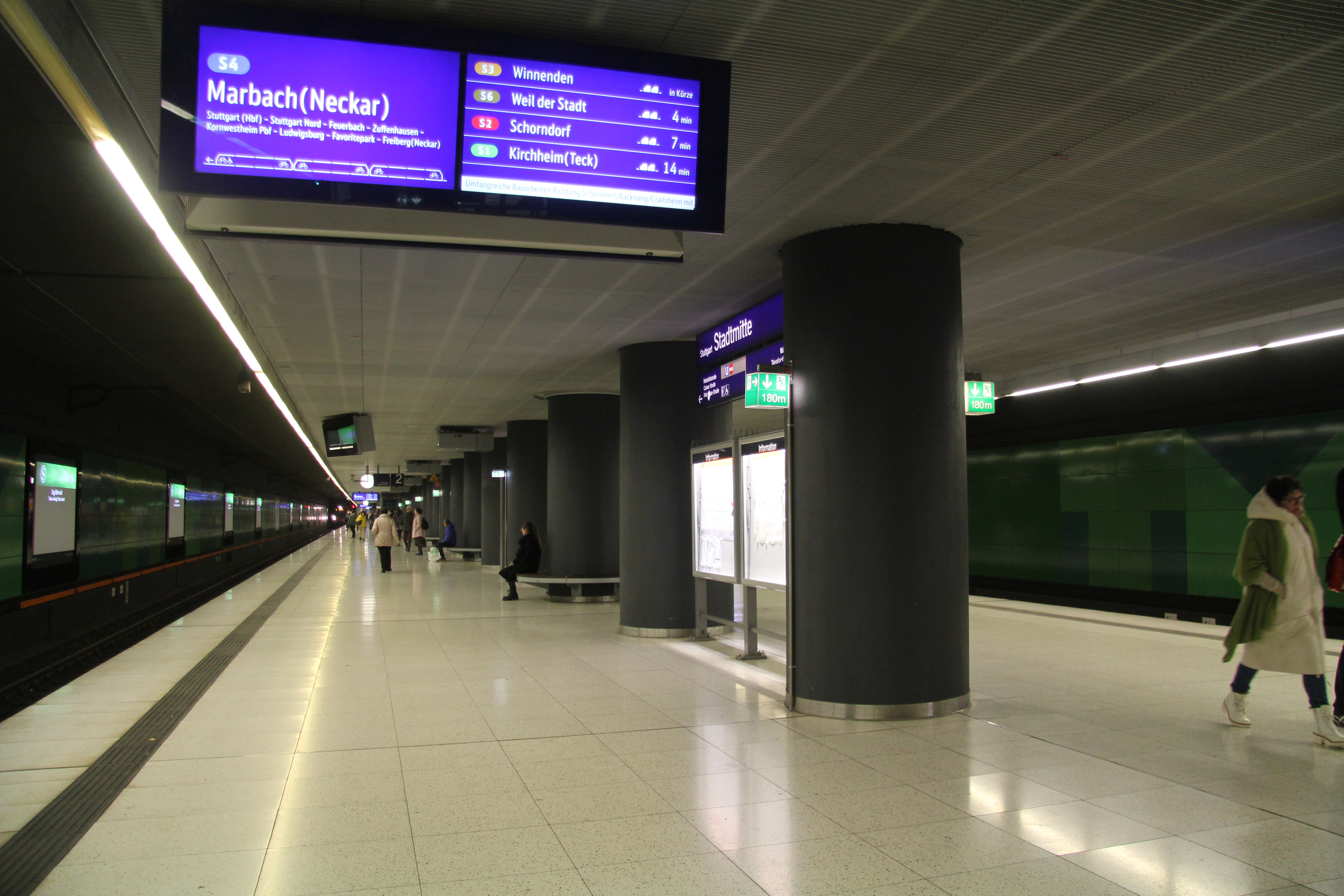
- The station in 2023

General information
- Location: Theodor-Heuss-Straße/Rotebühlplatz; 70173 Stuttgart; BW, Germany
- Coordinates: 48°46′34″N 9°10′23″E
- Owner: DB Netz
- Operator: DB Station&Service
- Lines: Verbindungsbahn (Stuttgart) (KBS 790.x)
- Platforms: 1 island platform
- Tracks: 2
- Train operators: S-Bahn Stuttgart

Other information
- Station code: 6085
- DS100 code: TSMI
- IBNR: 8006700
- Category: 3
- Fare zone: : 1
- Website: www.bahnhof.de

History
- Opened: 1 October 1978; 47 years ago

Services
Preceding station	Stuttgart S-Bahn	Following station
Feuersee towards Herrenberg	S1	Hauptbahnhof towards Kirchheim (Teck)
Feuersee towards Filderstadt	S2	Hauptbahnhof towards Schorndorf
Feuersee towards Flughafen/Messe	S3	Hauptbahnhof towards Backnang
Feuersee towards Schwabstraße	S4	Hauptbahnhof towards Backnang
Feuersee towards Schwabstraße	S5	Hauptbahnhof towards Bietigheim-Bissingen
Feuersee towards Schwabstraße	S6	Hauptbahnhof towards Weil der Stadt
Feuersee towards Schwabstraße	S60	Hauptbahnhof towards Böblingen
Location

Stuttgart Stadtmitte station is a railway station in the capital city of Stuttgart, located in Baden-Württemberg, Germany.
