= List of busiest railway stations in Europe =

Below is a list of the busiest railway stations in Europe. Train stations with more than 30 million passengers per year are shown.

Only data from national networks is shown. Notably, the London stations only include figures on the National Rail network and not journeys on the London Underground network, while the Paris stations include all journeys on the SNCF mainline network and RER, but not RER operated by the RATP and the Paris Métro. The number of platforms does not include rapid transit systems, referring exclusively to mainline or commuter rail platforms.

== Busiest railway stations in Europe ==
Country	City	Railway Station	Passengers (millions per year)				Platforms	Sourced data year
Country	City	Railway Station	National rail	Rapid Transit	Commuter	Long Distance	Platforms	Sourced data year
France	Paris	Gare du Nord	257	51.1	47.4		30	2024
Germany	Hamburg	Hamburg Hauptbahnhof	196				12	2019
Germany	Frankfurt am Main	Frankfurt (Main) Hauptbahnhof	179.9				29	2019
Italy	Rome	Roma Termini	175				32	2023
Switzerland	Zürich	Zürich HB	164.2				26	2025
Germany	Munich	München Hbf	150.7				34	2019
Germany	Berlin	Berlin Hbf	120.1				16	2019
Italy	Milan	Milano Centrale	120				24	
Germany	Cologne	Köln Hbf	116.1				11	2019
France	Paris	Gare Saint-Lazare	114.1	46.9			27	2024
France	Paris	Gare de Lyon	113.2	36.5	37.5		28	2024
Spain	Madrid	Madrid Atocha	112.6		91.3	21.4	24	2023
United Kingdom	London	London Liverpool Street	102.7	67.2			19	2024–2025
Germany	Berlin	Berlin Friedrichstraße	95.6				8	2019
Germany	Hannover	Hannover Hbf	95.3				12	2019
Germany	Stuttgart	Stuttgart Hbf	93.1				17	2019
Germany	Berlin	Berlin Ostkreuz	91.3				12	2019
Germany	Düsseldorf	Düsseldorf Hbf	89.8				20	2019
Russia	Moscow	Moscow Yaroslavsky	78.6		71.8	6.8	16	2019
Germany	Nuremberg	Nürnberg Hbf	76.7				21	2019
Netherlands	Utrecht	Utrecht Centraal	75.7				16	2019
Germany	Berlin	Berlin Gesundbrunnen	74.1				10	2019
Netherlands	Amsterdam	Amsterdam Centraal	72.8				11	2019
Russia	Moscow	Moscow Kursky	71.1		58.3	12.8	17	2019
United Kingdom	London	London Waterloo	70.4	82.9			24	2024–2025
Italy	Turin	Torino Porta Nuova	70				20	
United Kingdom	London	London Paddington	69.9	48.6			15	2024–2025
France	Paris	Gare Montparnasse	68.9	29.9			28	2024
United Kingdom	London	Tottenham Court Road	68.1				2	2024–2025
Germany	Berlin	Berlin Südkreuz	65.3				10	2019
Switzerland	Bern	Bern	64.6 (Note: w/o figures from RBS)				17	2025
Germany	Munich	München Ostbf	63.5				14	2019
Germany	Munich	München Marienplatz	59.5				2	2019
Italy	Florence	Firenze Santa Maria Novella	59				19	
Italy	Bologna	Bologna Centrale	58				28	
Germany	Essen	Essen Hbf	55.5				13	2019
Germany	Berlin	Berlin Alexanderplatz	55.5				4	2019
Norway	Oslo	Oslo sentralstasjon	54.8				19	
United Kingdom	London	London Bridge	54.7	74.3			15	2024–2025
United Kingdom	London	London Victoria	53.8	85.5			19	2024–2025
Germany	Bremen	Bremen Hbf	53.7				9	2019
United Kingdom	London	Stratford	51.5	64.9			9	2024–2025
Italy	Rome	Roma Tiburtina	51				20	
Spain	Barcelona	Barcelona Sants	50.7		37.2	13.5	14	2023
Germany	Munich	München-Pasing	50.7				9	2019
Germany	Hamburg	Hamburg-Altona	50.4				12	2019
United Kingdom	London	Farringdon	50.2				4	2024–2025
Italy	Naples	Napoli Centrale	50				25	
Russia	Moscow	Moscow Kazansky	49.9		33.5	16.4	17	2019
Germany	Leipzig	Leipzig Hbf	49.3				21	2019
Germany	Duisburg	Duisburg Hbf	47.5				12	2019
Germany	Berlin	Berlin Zoologischer Garten	47.4				6	
Austria	Vienna	Wien Hbf	45.4				12	2024
Finland	Helsinki	Helsingin päärautatieasema	45.1		38.7	6.4	19	2019
Germany	Dortmund	Dortmund Hbf	44.9				16	2019
Germany	Mannheim	Mannheim Hbf	43.1			8	11	
Germany	Braunschweig	Braunschweig Hbf	43.1	40.8			9	2019
United Kingdom	London	Bond Street	42.8				2	2024–2025
France	Paris	Gare de l'Est	42.7	22.4			29	2024
France	Lyon	Lyon-Part-Dieu	42.4				12	2024
France	Juvisy-sur-Orge	Juvisy	41.9				13	2024
United Kingdom	London	London Euston	40.2	41.1			18	2024–2025
Russia	Moscow	Moscow Leningradsky	39.7		27.6	12.1	10	2019
Switzerland	Lucerne	Luzern	39.7				14	2025
Sweden	Stockholm	Stockholm City	39.2				4	2018
United Kingdom	London	London St Pancras	38.8	44.9			15	2024–2025
France	Paris	Magenta	38.8				4	2024
Spain	Madrid	Madrid Chamartín	38.3		26.8	11.4	25	2023
France	Paris	Haussmann–Saint-Lazare	38.3				4	2024
Switzerland	Winterthur	Winterthur	37.9				9	2025
Switzerland	Basel	Basel SBB	37.9 (Note: w/o SNCF figures)				23	2025
United Kingdom	London	Whitechapel	37.1				4	2024–2025
Netherlands	Rotterdam	Rotterdam Centraal	37.1				13	2019
Belgium	Brussels	Bruxelles-Midi/Brussel-Zuid	37				22	2024
France	Saint-Denis	Saint-Denis	37				6	2024
United Kingdom	Birmingham	Birmingham New Street	36.6				12	2024–2025
Germany	Berlin	Berlin Ostbahnhof	36.5				9	
Germany	Stuttgart	Stuttgart Stadtmitte	36.1				2	2019
Netherlands	The Hague	Den Haag Centraal	36.1				12	2019
Netherlands	Haarlemmermeer	Schiphol Airport	35.8				6	2019
Germany	Frankfurt am Main	Frankfurt (Main) Konstablerwache	35.8				2	2019
Belgium	Brussels	Bruxelles-Central/Brussel-Centraal	35.8				6	2024
Switzerland	Lausanne	Lausanne	35.6				10	2025
Belgium	Brussels	Bruxelles-Nord/Brussel-Noord	35.2				12	2024
Germany	Frankfurt am Main	Frankfurt (Main) Hauptwache	35				2	2019
Denmark	Copenhagen	Københavns Hovedbanegård	34.1	11	17.6	16.5	15	2025
Austria	Vienna	Wien Meidling	33.9				8	2024
Italy	Milan	Milano Cadorna	33.1				10	
Spain	Madrid	Nuevos Ministerios	32.9		32.9		6	2023
France	Puteaux	La Défense	31.7				10	2024
France	Aulnay-sous-Bois	Aulnay-sous-Bois	31.7				5	2024
Switzerland	Zürich	Zürich Oerlikon	31.5				8	2025
Italy	Venice	Venezia Mestre	31				13	
Germany	Berlin	Berlin-Lichtenberg	31				8	
Poland	Kraków	Kraków Główny	30.8				10	2025
Belgium	Ghent	Gent-Sint-Pieters	30.5				12	2024
Switzerland	Geneva	Genève	30.3				8	2025
Czechia	Prague	Praha hlavní nádraží	30.2				16	2017
Netherlands	Leiden	Leiden Centraal	30.2				6	2019
Italy	Venice	Venezia Santa Lucia	30				16	

== See also ==
- List of highest railway stations in Europe
- List of busiest railway stations
- List of busiest railway stations in Great Britain
- List of busiest railway stations in North America
