= List of busiest railway stations in North America =

This is a list of the busiest railway stations in North America. The figures are collected by the operating agencies of each railway station, and are estimates based on ticket usage data, crowd sizes and other extrapolations.

The ranking is based on annual passengers traveling by passenger rail or commuter rail; other visitors are not included. For example, Grand Central Terminal, a major attraction in New York City, sees nearly 750,000 people (Note: 750,000 people visit Grand Central Terminal and over 250,000 are commuters who commute using passenger rail, commuter rail, subways and buses. Which gives 500,000 non-transit visitors.) daily to shop, dine, conduct business, meet family and friends, or admire the station. As well, nearly 45 million passengers use the nearby subway station each year. Because these people are not using passenger or commuter rail services, they are not included in Grand Central's passenger count.

== List ==
As of 2018, stations that see at least 10 million annual passengers include:

| Rank | Country | City | Station | Annual entries/exits (millions; 2017–18) | Main services | Number of platforms | Interchange systems | Image |
|---|---|---|---|---|---|---|---|---|
| 1 | United States | New York City | New York Penn Station | 107.416 (Note: Total is derived by adding up passengers on LIRR, NJ Transit and Amtrak. LIRR 2017 Totals breaks down as follows: 117180 daily weekday arrivals, 116160 daily weekday departures, 48960 Saturday arrivals, 48470 Saturday departures, 36950 Sunday arrivals, 40700 Sunday departures. This gives us a yearly total of ((117180+116160)*5+(48960+48470)+(36950+40700))*52 = 69,722,560. NJ Transit 2017 Totals breaks down as follows: 93,305 weekday arrivals and departures from Penn Station. Breakdown for Saturday and Sunday is not given but it can be calculated by looking at the percentage drop in total ridership. 307853 total trips took place on NJ Transit on a weekday, 104088 took place on Saturday and 87709 on Sunday. Which means ridership on Saturday is 33.8% that of an average weekday and ridership on Sunday is 28.5% that of a weekday. Which gives (93305*0.338) = 31547 arrivals and departures from Penn Station on Saturday and (93305*0.285) = 26853 arrivals and departures from Penn Station Sunday. Giving us a yearly total of ((93305*5)+31547+26853)*52 = 27,296,100. Amtrak 2017 total is: 10,397,729. Totaling up these 3 figures gives us: 69,722,560+27,296,100+10,397,729 = 107,416,389) | Amtrak, LIRR, NJ Transit | 11 (21 tracks) | New York City Subway, PATH | |
| 2 | Canada | Toronto | Toronto Union Station | 72.410 | Amtrak, GO Transit, UP Express, Via Rail | 12 (16 tracks) | Toronto streetcar, Toronto subway | |
| 3 | United States | New York City | Grand Central Terminal | 67.326 | Metro-North | 44 (67 tracks) | New York City Subway, LIRR | |
| 4 | United States | New York City | Jamaica Station | 59.803 (Note: The number given in the source is the total count of passengers who pass through the station on a typical weekday (200,000). The majority of these riders stay on their train bound for western termini or eastern Long Island stations. A handful of riders change trains at Jamaica to access a train that goes to their destination. Only a small fraction of the 200,000 passengers use Jamaica as their primary destination (using subway, bus, AirTrain, rideshare, or walking to reach their final destination); thus, the actual number of entries and exits at Jamaica is likely significantly lower than 200,000. Notably, the source for the 200,000 figure is from 2011; there have been major changes in ridership patterns since then, including the effects of the pandemic, expansion of the CityTicket program, and the opening of Grand Central Madison. It is important to consider this context when extrapolating ridership numbers from a fifteen-year old source.) | LIRR | 6 (10 tracks) | AirTrain JFK, New York City Subway | |
| 5 | United States | Chicago | Chicago Union Station | 43.948 | Amtrak, Metra | 30 (24 tracks) | Chicago "L" | |
| 6 | United States | Chicago | Ogilvie Transportation Center | 31.905 | Metra | 8 (16 tracks) | Chicago "L" | |
| 7 | United States | Boston | South Station | 28.875 | Amtrak, MBTA Commuter Rail | 8 (13 tracks) | MBTA subway | |
| 8 | Mexico | Mexico City | Buenavista | 19.393 | Tren Suburbano | 4 | Mexico City Metro | |
| 9 | United States | Newark | Newark Penn Station | 17.881 | Amtrak, NJ Transit | 6 | Newark Light Rail, PATH | |
| 10 | United States | New York City | Grand Central Madison | 17.1 | LIRR | 4 | New York City Subway, Metro-North | Inaugural Train Ride To Grand Central Madison - 52648295102 |
| 11 | United States | Philadelphia | 30th Street Station | 16.197 | Amtrak, NJ Transit, SEPTA Regional Rail | 9 | SEPTA Metro | |
| 12 | United States | Hoboken | Hoboken Terminal | 14.950 | NJ Transit, Metro-North | 10 | HBLR, PATH, NY Waterway | |
| 13 | United States | Washington, D.C. | Washington Union Station | 13.665 | Amtrak, MARC, VRE | 18 | Washington Metro | |
| 14 | Mexico | Cuautitlán | Cuautitlán | 11.728 | Tren Suburbano | 1 | | |
| 15 | United States | Secaucus | Secaucus Junction | 11.097 | NJ Transit | 5 | | |
| 16 | United States | Los Angeles | Los Angeles Union Station | 10.999 | Amtrak, Metro Rail, Metrolink | 9 | | |
| 17 | United States | Chicago | Millennium Station | 10.764 | Metra, South Shore Line | 6 | Chicago "L" | |
| 18 | Canada | Montreal | Montreal Central Station | 10.687 | Amtrak, Exo, REM, Via Rail | 7 | Montreal Metro | |

== See also ==
- List of busiest Amtrak stations
- List of busiest railway stations
- List of busiest railway stations in Europe
- List of busiest railway stations in Great Britain
