= List of busiest railway stations in West Yorkshire =

This is a list of the busiest railway stations in West Yorkshire, between 2012 and 2023. During this period, Leeds railway station has been the busiest, with Huddersfield ranked in second place. By the 2022–2023 year, Leeds was the second busiest station on the United Kingdom's railway network outside London.

== 2012–2013 statistics ==
Rank	Station	Area served	District	Operator (Note: Operator during period of station usage)	Platforms	Passenger usage	Rank change
1.	Leeds	Leeds	Leeds	Network Rail	17	26.2 million	Steady
2.	Huddersfield	Huddersfield	Kirklees	First TransPennine Express	6	4.65 million	Steady
3.	Bradford Interchange	Bradford	Bradford	Northern Rail	4	3.00 million	Steady
4.	Wakefield Westgate	Wakefield	Wakefield	East Coast	2	2.26 million	Steady
5.	Bradford Forster Square	Bradford	Bradford	Northern Rail	3	2.04 million	Steady
6.	Halifax	Halifax	Calderdale	Northern Rail	2	1.91 million	Steady
7.	Shipley	Shipley	Bradford	Northern Rail	5	1.67 million	Steady
8.	Keighley	Keighley	Bradford	Northern Rail	4 (Note: 2 National Rail, 2 Keighley and Worth Valley Railway)	1.62 million	Steady
9.	Dewsbury	Dewsbury	Kirklees	First TransPennine Express	2	1.60 million	Steady
10.	Ilkley	Ilkley	Bradford	Northern Rail	2	1.21 million	Steady

== 2013–2014 statistics ==
Rank	Station	Area served	District	Operator (Note: Operator during period of station usage)	Platforms	Passenger usage	Rank change
1.	Leeds	Leeds	Leeds	Network Rail	17	27.7 million	Steady
2.	Huddersfield	Huddersfield	Kirklees	First TransPennine Express	6	4.81 million	Steady
3.	Bradford Interchange	Bradford	Bradford	Northern Rail	4	2.99 million	Steady
4.	Wakefield Westgate	Wakefield	Wakefield	East Coast	2	2.35 million	Steady
5.	Bradford Forster Square	Bradford	Bradford	Northern Rail	3	2.04 million	Steady
6.	Halifax	Halifax	Calderdale	Northern Rail	2	1.91 million	Steady
7.	Shipley	Shipley	Bradford	Northern Rail	5	1.73 million	Steady
8.	Dewsbury	Dewsbury	Kirklees	First TransPennine Express	2	1.67 million	▲1
9.	Keighley	Keighley	Bradford	Northern Rail	4 (Note: 2 National Rail, 2 Keighley and Worth Valley Railway)	1.63 million	▼1
10.	Ilkley	Ilkley	Bradford	Northern Rail	2	1.25 million	Steady

== 2014–2015 statistics ==
Rank	Station	Area served	District	Operator (Note: Operator during period of station usage)	Platforms	Passenger usage	Rank change
1.	Leeds	Leeds	Leeds	Network Rail	17	28.8 million	Steady
2.	Huddersfield	Huddersfield	Kirklees	First TransPennine Express	6	4.99 million	Steady
3.	Bradford Interchange	Bradford	Bradford	Northern Rail	4	2.92 million	Steady
4.	Wakefield Westgate	Wakefield	Wakefield	East Coast	2	2.48 million	Steady
5.	Bradford Forster Square	Bradford	Bradford	Northern Rail	3	2.08 million	Steady
6.	Halifax	Halifax	Calderdale	Northern Rail	2	1.93 million	Steady
7.	Shipley	Shipley	Bradford	Northern Rail	5	1.77 million	Steady
8.	Keighley	Keighley	Bradford	Northern Rail	4 (Note: 2 National Rail, 2 Keighley and Worth Valley Railway)	1.72 million	▲1
9.	Dewsbury	Dewsbury	Kirklees	First TransPennine Express	2	1.69 million	▼1
10.	Ilkley	Ilkley	Bradford	Northern Rail	2	1.29 million	Steady

== 2015–2016 statistics ==
Rank	Station	Area served	District	Operator (Note: Operator during period of station usage)	Platforms	Passenger usage	Rank change
1.	Leeds	Leeds	Leeds	Network Rail	17	29.7 million	Steady
2.	Huddersfield	Huddersfield	Kirklees	First TransPennine Express	6	5.04 million	Steady
3.	Bradford Interchange	Bradford	Bradford	Northern Rail	4	2.99 million	Steady
4.	Wakefield Westgate	Wakefield	Wakefield	Virgin Trains East Coast	2	2.51 million	Steady
5.	Bradford Forster Square	Bradford	Bradford	Northern Rail	3	2.11 million	Steady
6.	Halifax	Halifax	Calderdale	Northern Rail	2	1.98 million	Steady
7.	Shipley	Shipley	Bradford	Northern Rail	5	1.73 million	Steady
8.	Keighley	Keighley	Bradford	Northern Rail	4 (Note: 2 National Rail, 2 Keighley and Worth Valley Railway)	1.70 million	Steady
9.	Dewsbury	Dewsbury	Kirklees	First TransPennine Express	2	1.69 million	Steady
10.	Ilkley	Ilkley	Bradford	Northern Rail	2	1.30 million	Steady

== 2016–2017 statistics ==
Rank	Station	Area served	District	Operator (Note: Operator during period of station usage)	Platforms	Passenger usage	Rank change
1.	Leeds	Leeds	Leeds	Network Rail	17	30.9 million	Steady
2.	Huddersfield	Huddersfield	Kirklees	TransPennine Express	6	5.09 million	Steady
3.	Bradford Interchange	Bradford	Bradford	Arriva Rail North	4	2.97 million	Steady
4.	Wakefield Westgate	Wakefield	Wakefield	Virgin Trains East Coast	2	2.54 million	Steady
5.	Bradford Forster Square	Bradford	Bradford	Arriva Rail North	3	2.11 million	Steady
6.	Halifax	Halifax	Calderdale	Arriva Rail North	2	1.99 million	Steady
7.	Shipley	Shipley	Bradford	Arriva Rail North	5	1.74 million	Steady
8.	Dewsbury	Dewsbury	Kirklees	TransPennine Express	2	1.73 million	▲1
9.	Keighley	Keighley	Bradford	Arriva Rail North	4 (Note: 2 National Rail, 2 Keighley and Worth Valley Railway)	1.70 million	▼1
10.	Ilkley	Ilkley	Bradford	Arriva Rail North	2	1.35 million	Steady

== 2017–2018 statistics ==
Rank	Station	Area served	District	Operator (Note: Operator during period of station usage)	Platforms	Passenger usage	Rank change
1.	Leeds	Leeds	Leeds	Network Rail	17	31.1 million	Steady
2.	Huddersfield	Huddersfield	Kirklees	TransPennine Express	6	5.10 million	Steady
3.	Bradford Interchange	Bradford	Bradford	Arriva Rail North	4	2.76 million	Steady
4.	Wakefield Westgate	Wakefield	Wakefield	Virgin Trains East Coast	2	2.47 million	Steady
5.	Bradford Forster Square	Bradford	Bradford	Arriva Rail North	3	2.02 million	Steady
6.	Halifax	Halifax	Calderdale	Arriva Rail North	2	1.94 million	Steady
7.	Shipley	Shipley	Bradford	Arriva Rail North	5	1.71 million	Steady
8.	Dewsbury	Dewsbury	Kirklees	TransPennine Express	2	1.69 million	Steady
9.	Keighley	Keighley	Bradford	Arriva Rail North	4 (Note: 2 National Rail, 2 Keighley and Worth Valley Railway)	1.66 million	Steady
10.	Ilkley	Ilkley	Bradford	Arriva Rail North	2	1.33 million	Steady

== 2018–2019 statistics ==
Rank	Station	Area served	District	Operator (Note: Operator during period of station usage)	Platforms	Passenger usage	Rank change
1.	Leeds	Leeds	Leeds	Network Rail	17	30.8 million	Steady
2.	Huddersfield	Huddersfield	Kirklees	TransPennine Express	6	4.89 million	Steady
3.	Bradford Interchange	Bradford	Bradford	Arriva Rail North	4	2.60 million	Steady
4.	Wakefield Westgate	Wakefield	Wakefield	London North Eastern Railway	2	2.47 million	Steady
5.	Bradford Forster Square	Bradford	Bradford	Arriva Rail North	3	1.99 million	Steady
6.	Halifax	Halifax	Calderdale	Arriva Rail North	2	1.84 million	Steady
7.	Shipley	Shipley	Bradford	Arriva Rail North	5	1.70 million	Steady
8.	Dewsbury	Dewsbury	Kirklees	TransPennine Express	2	1.66 million	Steady
9.	Keighley	Keighley	Bradford	Arriva Rail North	4 (Note: 2 National Rail, 2 Keighley and Worth Valley Railway)	1.62 million	Steady
10.	Ilkley	Ilkley	Bradford	Arriva Rail North	2	1.34 million	Steady

== 2019–2020 statistics ==
Rank	Station	Area served	District	Operator (Note: Operator during period of station usage)	Platforms	Passenger usage	Rank change
1.	Leeds	Leeds	Leeds	Network Rail	17	31.0 million	Steady
2.	Huddersfield	Huddersfield	Kirklees	TransPennine Express	6	4.76 million	Steady
3.	Bradford Interchange	Bradford	Bradford	Arriva Rail North	4	2.67 million	Steady
4.	Wakefield Westgate	Wakefield	Wakefield	London North Eastern Railway	2	2.40 million	Steady
5.	Bradford Forster Square	Bradford	Bradford	Arriva Rail North	3	1.94 million	Steady
6.	Halifax	Halifax	Calderdale	Arriva Rail North	2	1.91 million	Steady
7.	Shipley	Shipley	Bradford	Arriva Rail North	5	1.66 million	Steady
8.	Dewsbury	Dewsbury	Kirklees	TransPennine Express	2	1.62 million	Steady
9.	Keighley	Keighley	Bradford	Arriva Rail North	4 (Note: 2 National Rail, 2 Keighley and Worth Valley Railway)	1.57 million	Steady
10.	Ilkley	Ilkley	Bradford	Arriva Rail North	2	1.32 million	Steady

== 2020–2021 statistics ==
Rank	Station	Area served	District	Operator (Note: Operator during period of station usage)	Platforms	Passenger usage (Note: Passenger usage numbers decrease due to COVID-19 pandemic lockdowns)	Rank change
1.	Leeds	Leeds	Leeds	Network Rail	17	5.85 million	Steady
2.	Huddersfield	Huddersfield	Kirklees	TransPennine Express	6	1.02 million	Steady
3.	Bradford Interchange	Bradford	Bradford	Arriva Rail North	4	0.66 million	Steady
4.	Bradford Forster Square	Bradford	Bradford	Arriva Rail North	3	0.61 million	▼1
5.	Wakefield Westgate	Wakefield	Wakefield	London North Eastern Railway	2	0.54 million	▼1
6.	Keighley	Keighley	Bradford	Arriva Rail North	4 (Note: 2 National Rail, 2 Keighley and Worth Valley Railway)	0.52 million	▲3
7.	Shipley	Shipley	Bradford	Arriva Rail North	5	0.45 million	Steady
8.	Dewsbury	Dewsbury	Kirklees	TransPennine Express	2	0.43 million	Steady
9.	Ilkley	Ilkley	Bradford	Arriva Rail North	2	0.40 million	▲1
10.	Halifax	Halifax	Calderdale	Arriva Rail North	2	0.36 million	▼4

== 2021–2022 statistics ==
Rank	Station	Area served	District	Operator (Note: Operator during period of station usage)	Platforms	Passenger usage (Note: Passenger usage numbers still recovering after COVID-19)	Rank change
1.	Leeds	Leeds	Leeds	Network Rail	17	19.2 million	Steady
2.	Huddersfield	Huddersfield	Kirklees	TransPennine Express	6	3.04 million	Steady
3.	Wakefield Westgate	Wakefield	Wakefield	London North Eastern Railway	2	1.78 million	▲2
4.	Bradford Interchange	Bradford	Bradford	Arriva Rail North	4	1.76 million	▼1
5.	Bradford Forster Square	Bradford	Bradford	Arriva Rail North	3	1.30 million	▼1
6.	Halifax	Halifax	Calderdale	Arriva Rail North	2	1.16 million	▲4
7.	Keighley	Keighley	Bradford	Arriva Rail North	4 (Note: 2 National Rail, 2 Keighley and Worth Valley Railway)	1.15 million	▼1
8.	Dewsbury	Dewsbury	Kirklees	TransPennine Express	2	1.06 million	Steady
9.	Shipley	Shipley	Bradford	Arriva Rail North	5	1.01 million	▼2
10.	Ilkley	Ilkley	Bradford	Arriva Rail North	2	0.93 million	▼1

== 2022–2023 statistics ==
Rank	Station	Area served	District	Operator (Note: Operator during period of station usage)	Platforms	Passenger usage	Rank change
1.	Leeds	Leeds	Leeds	Network Rail	17	23.9 million	Steady
2.	Huddersfield	Huddersfield	Kirklees	TransPennine Express	6	3.02 million	Steady
3.	Bradford Interchange	Bradford	Bradford	Arriva Rail North	4	2.22 million	▲1
4.	Wakefield Westgate	Wakefield	Wakefield	London North Eastern Railway	2	1.93 million	▼1
5.	Bradford Forster Square	Bradford	Bradford	Arriva Rail North	3	1.43 million	Steady
6.	Halifax	Halifax	Calderdale	Arriva Rail North	2	1.41 million	Steady
7.	Keighley	Keighley	Bradford	Arriva Rail North	4 (Note: 2 National Rail, 2 Keighley and Worth Valley Railway)	1.29 million	Steady
8.	Ilkley	Ilkley	Bradford	Arriva Rail North	2	1.11 million	▲2
9.	Shipley	Shipley	Bradford	Arriva Rail North	5	1.10 million	Steady
10.	Dewsbury	Dewsbury	Kirklees	TransPennine Express	2	1.03 million	▼2

== See also ==
- List of busiest railway stations in North Yorkshire
