= High Street Kensington =

High Street Kensington may refer to:

- Kensington High Street, a popular shopping street in London
- High Street Kensington, a Tube station on the Circle and District Lines
