= Gloucester Road tube station =

London Underground station

Gloucester Road
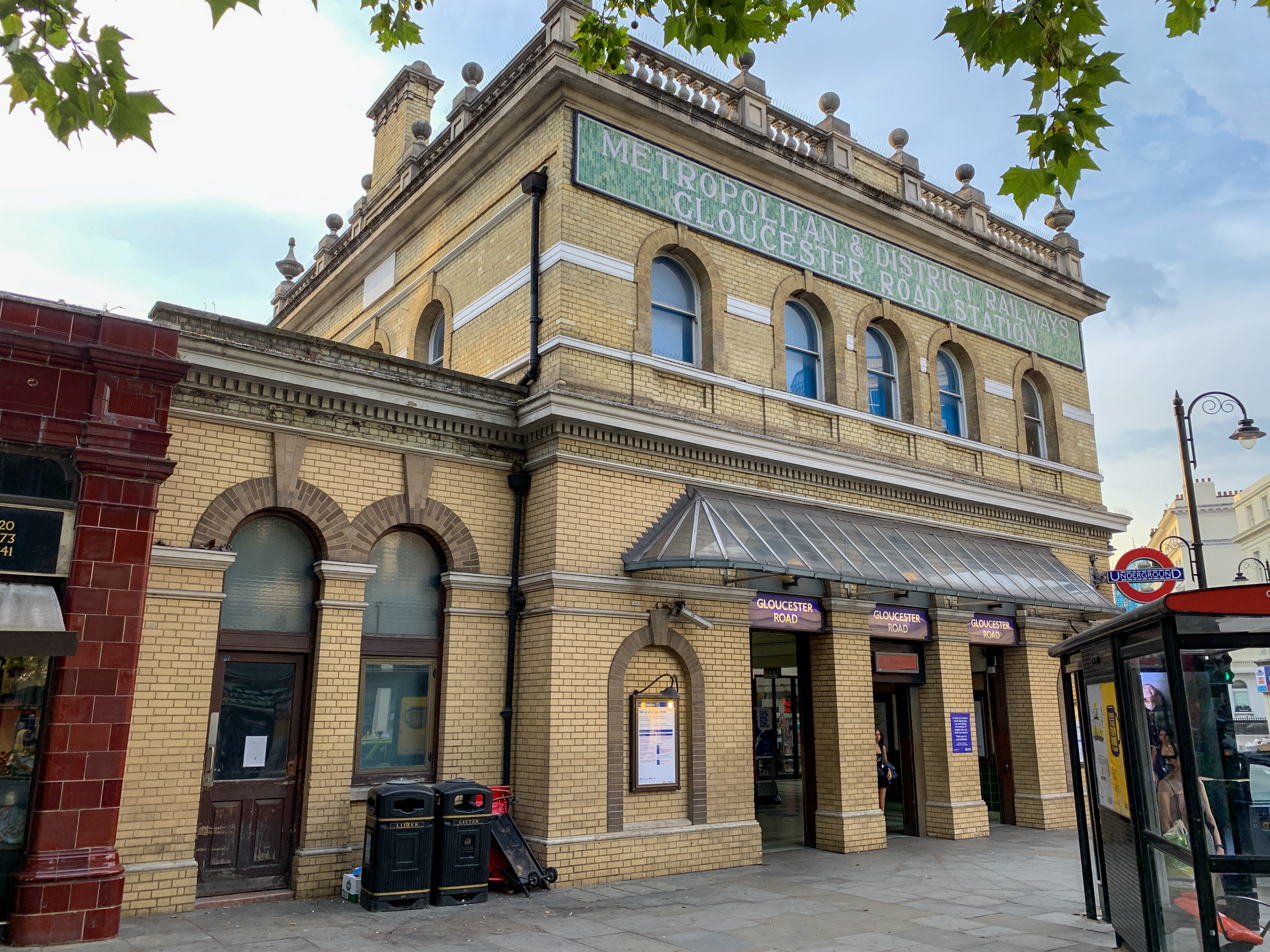
- Station entrance
- Interactive map of Gloucester Road

General information
- Location: South Kensington
- Local authority: Royal Borough of Kensington and Chelsea
- Managed by: London Underground
- Number of platforms: 5
- Fare zone: 1

London Underground annual entry and exit
- 2020: ▼3.93 million
- 2021: ▲6.97 million
- 2022: ▲10.49 million
- 2023: ▲11.35 million
- 2024: ▲12.03 million

Key dates
- 1 October 1868: Opened (MR)
- 24 December 1868: Started (DR)
- 12 April 1869: Opened West Brompton extension (DR)
- 1 February 1872: Started "Outer Circle" (NLR)
- 1 August 1872: Started "Middle Circle" (H&CR/DR)
- 30 June 1900: Ended "Middle Circle"
- 15 December 1906: Opened (GNP&BR)
- 31 December 1908: Ended "Outer Circle"
- 1949: Started (Circle line)

Listed status
- Listing grade: II
- Entry number: 1080658
- Added to list: 7 November 1984

Other information
- External links: TfL station info page
- Coordinates: 51.4947°N 0.1830°W

Gloucester Road (/ˈɡlɒstər ˈroʊd/) is a London Underground station in Kensington, West London. Its entrance is located close to the junction of Gloucester Road and Cromwell Road. Close by are the Cromwell Hospital and Baden-Powell House.

The station is served by three lines: Circle, District and Piccadilly. On the District and Piccadilly lines, the station is between Earl's Court and South Kensington stations. On the Circle line, it is between South Kensington and High Street Kensington stations. It is in London fare zone 1.

The station is in two parts: sub-surface platforms, opened in 1868 by the Metropolitan Railway as part of the company's extension of the Inner Circle route from Paddington to South Kensington and to Westminster; and deep-level platforms opened in 1906 by the Great Northern, Piccadilly and Brompton Railway. A variety of underground and main line services have operated over the sub-surface tracks. The deep-level platforms have remained largely unaltered with lift access. A disused sub-surface platform features periodic art installations as part of Transport for London's Art on the Underground scheme.

The station building is Grade II listed.

== History ==
=== Sub-surface station ===
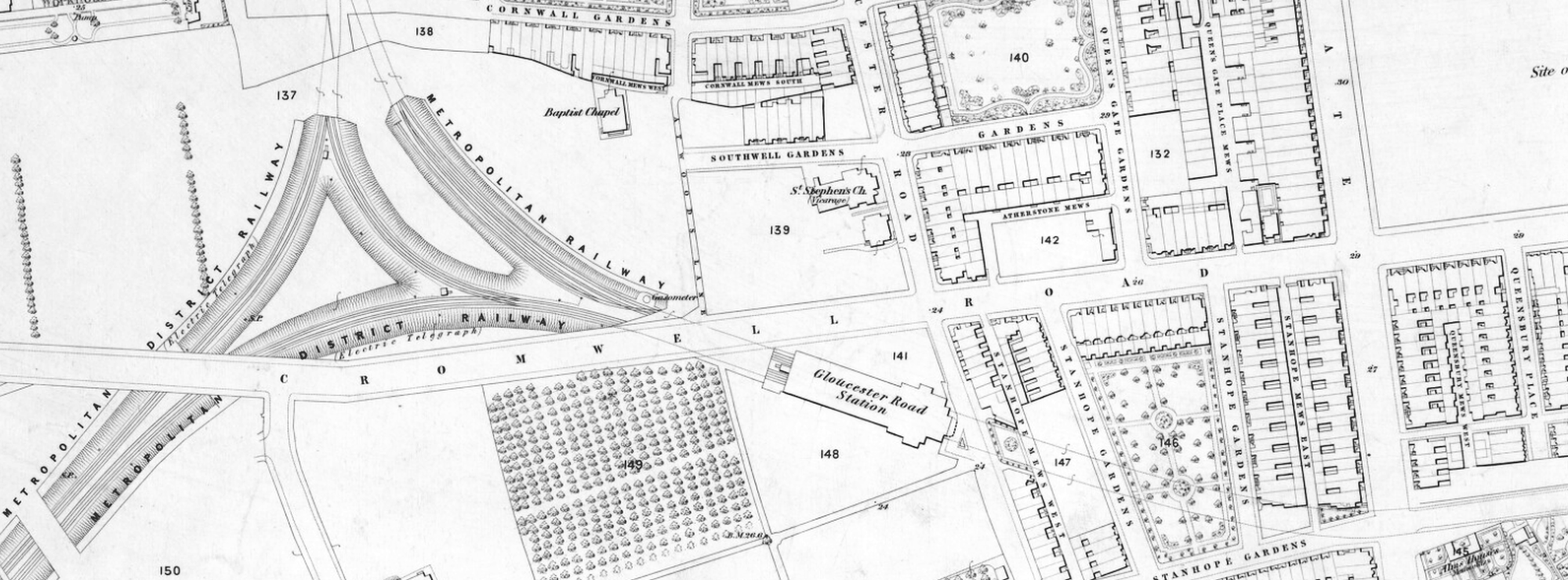
Ordnance Survey map showing the newly constructed Gloucester Road station, 1869

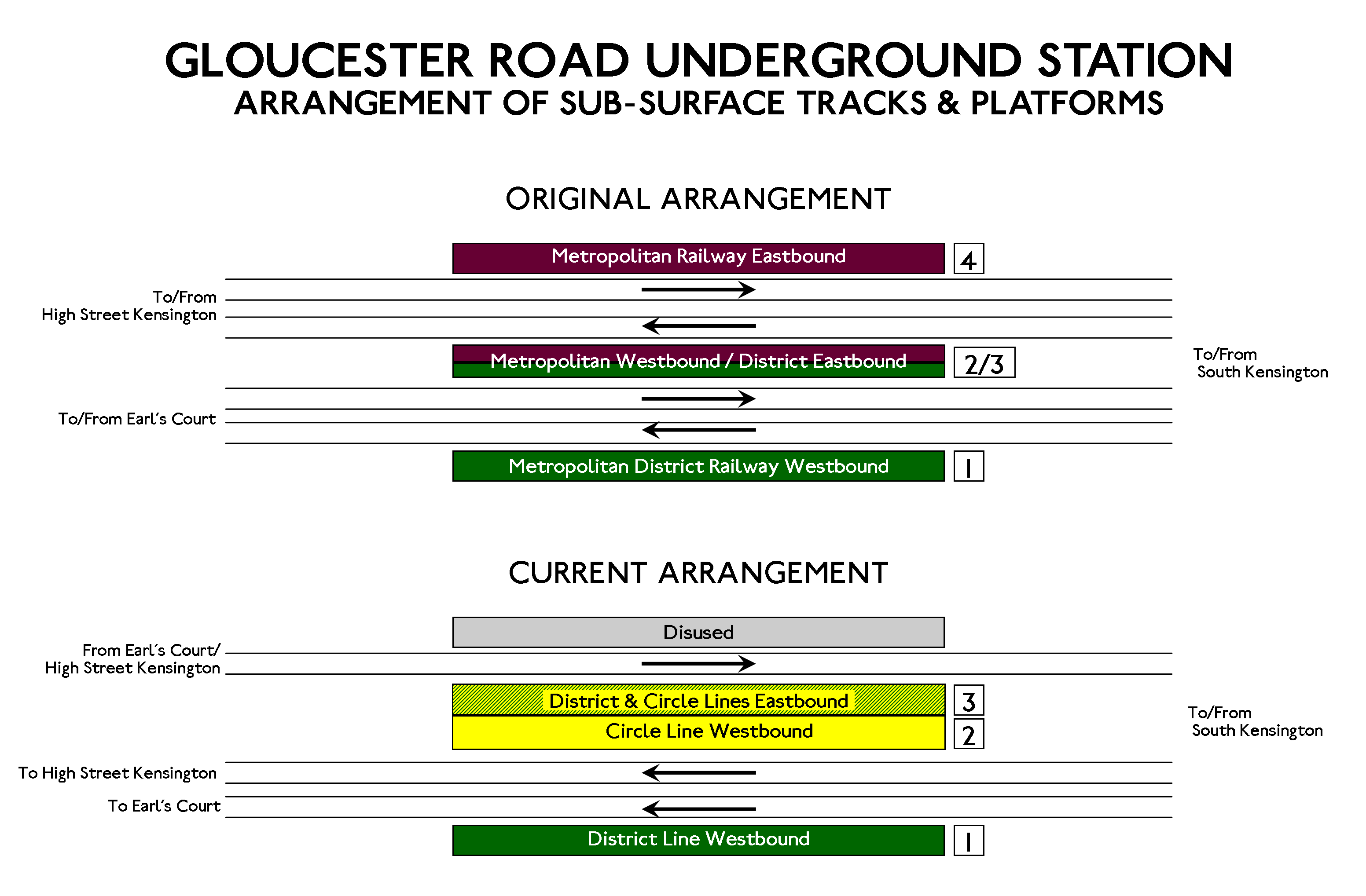
Original and current layout of sub-surface platforms

The station was opened as Brompton (Gloucester Road) on 1 October 1868 by the Metropolitan Railway (MR, later the Metropolitan line) when it opened an extension from Paddington (Praed Street) (now Paddington). The station acted as the temporary terminus of the railway until 24 December 1868 when the MR opened tracks to South Kensington to connect to the first section of the District Railway (DR, later the District line) which opened on the same day from South Kensington to Westminster. The station was provided with four platforms sheltered by an elliptical glazed iron roof. A two-storey station building in cream-coloured brick with arched windows and an ornamental balustrade at roof level was built at the eastern end. Initially, the MR operated all services over both companies' tracks.

Residential development had been gradually spreading westward from Belgravia since the 1840s, but the area around the station site was mainly in horticultural use as market gardens when the new line was constructed. The planning of the line encouraged the local land owners, including Lord Kensington, to extend Cromwell Road westwards and the opening of Gloucester Road station, stimulated rapid residential development in the surrounding area.

On 12 April 1869, the DR opened a south-westward extension from Gloucester Road to West Brompton where it opened an interchange station with the West London Extension Joint Railway (WLEJR, now the West London line). At the opening there was no intermediate station – Earl's Court station did not open until 1871 – and the service operated as a shuttle between the two stations. On 1 August 1870, the DR opened additional tracks between Gloucester Road and South Kensington and the West Brompton shuttle became a through service.

On 3 July 1871, the DR opened its own tracks between Gloucester Road and High Street Kensington. These tracks, the Cromwell Curve, were opened without Parliamentary authority in an unsuccessful attempt by the DR to improve its share of the revenues between High Street Kensington and South Kensington stations which were divided on the basis of mileage of track owned by the two companies. (Note: Although the Cromwell Curve was not often used, the dispute between the DR and MR continued until 1903.)

On 1 February 1872, the DR opened a northbound branch from its station at Earl's Court to connect to the West London Extension Joint Railway (WLEJR, now the West London line) at Addison Road (now Kensington (Olympia)). From that date the Outer Circle service began running over the DR's tracks. The service was run by the North London Railway (NLR) from its terminus at Broad Street (now demolished) in the City of London via the North London line to Willesden Junction, then the West London Line to Addison Road and the DR to Mansion House – at that time the eastern terminus of the DR.

From 1 August 1872, the Middle Circle service also began operations through Gloucester Road, running from Moorgate along the MR's tracks on the north side of the Inner Circle to Paddington, then over the Hammersmith & City Railway (H&CR) track to Latimer Road, then, via a now demolished link, on the WLEJR to Addison Road and the DR to Mansion House. The service was operated jointly by the H&CR and the DR.

On 30 June 1900, the Middle Circle service was withdrawn between Earl's Court and Mansion House, and, on 31 December 1908, the Outer Circle service was also shortened to terminate at Earl's Court. The station was redesigned by Metropolitan Railway consultant architect George Campbell Sherrin, including removing of the elliptical roof. In 1949, the Metropolitan line-operated Inner Circle route was given its own identity on the tube map as the Circle line. In 1907, "Brompton" was dropped from the station's name to bring it into accordance with the deep-level station.

In the 1970s, the eastbound Circle line platform was taken out of use and the track layout was rearranged to remove the westbound Circle line track and widen the island platform. The eastbound Circle and District lines both serve the north side of the island platform and the westbound Circle line which was redirected to serve the south side of the island platform. The disused platform is used for Art on the Underground installations, often placed into the brick recesses in the northern retaining wall. In the 1990s a deck was constructed above the District and Circle line platforms on which was constructed a shopping mall and apartment building.

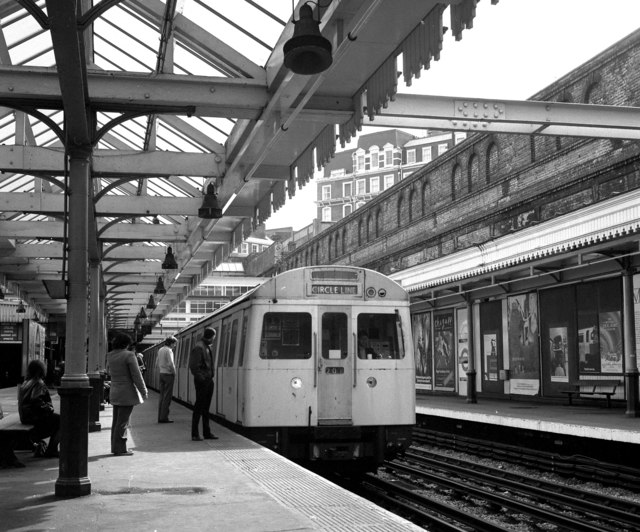
Eastbound view of the Circle and District line platform, before deck was constructed

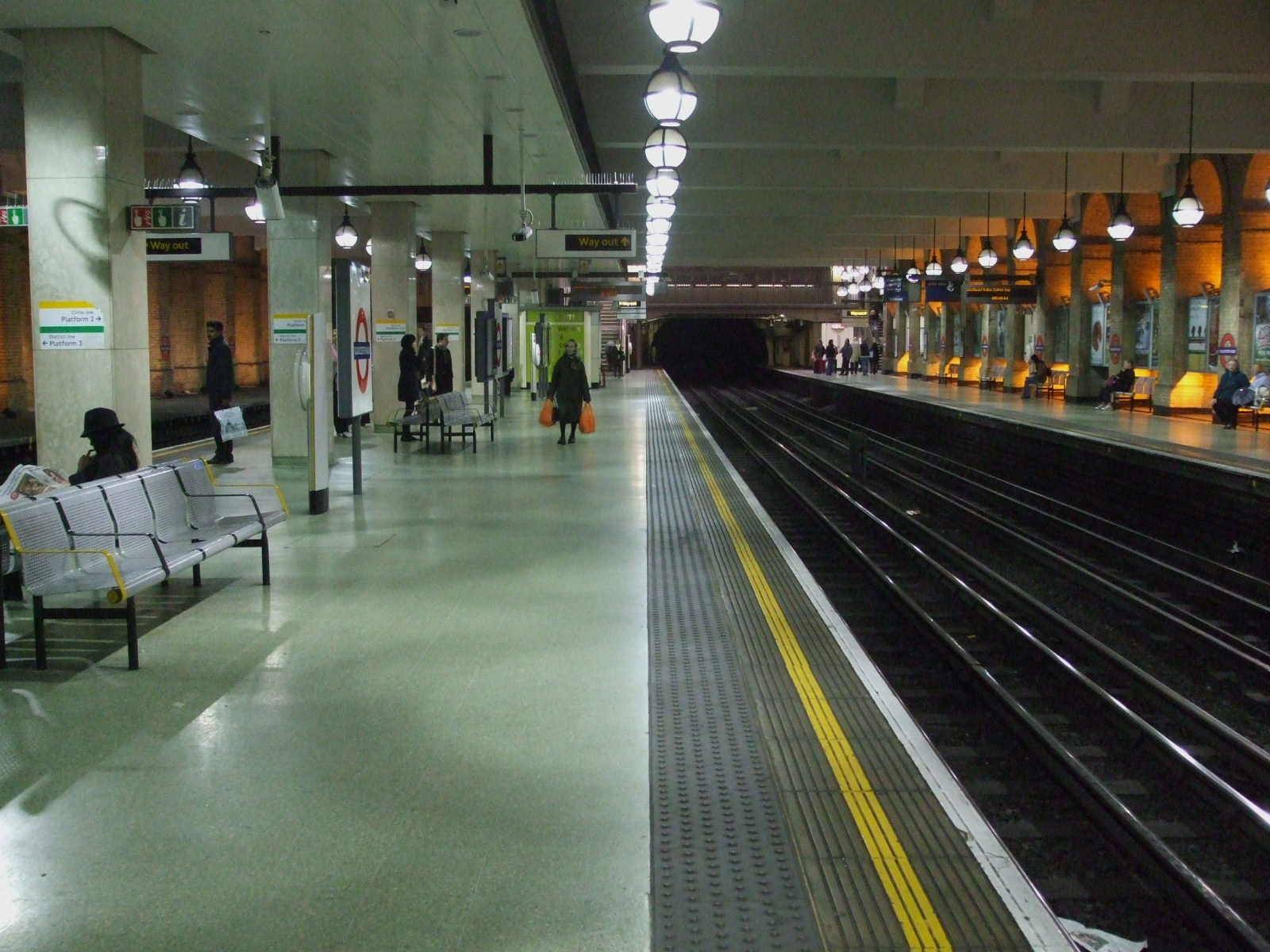
Modern eastbound view of Circle and District line platforms

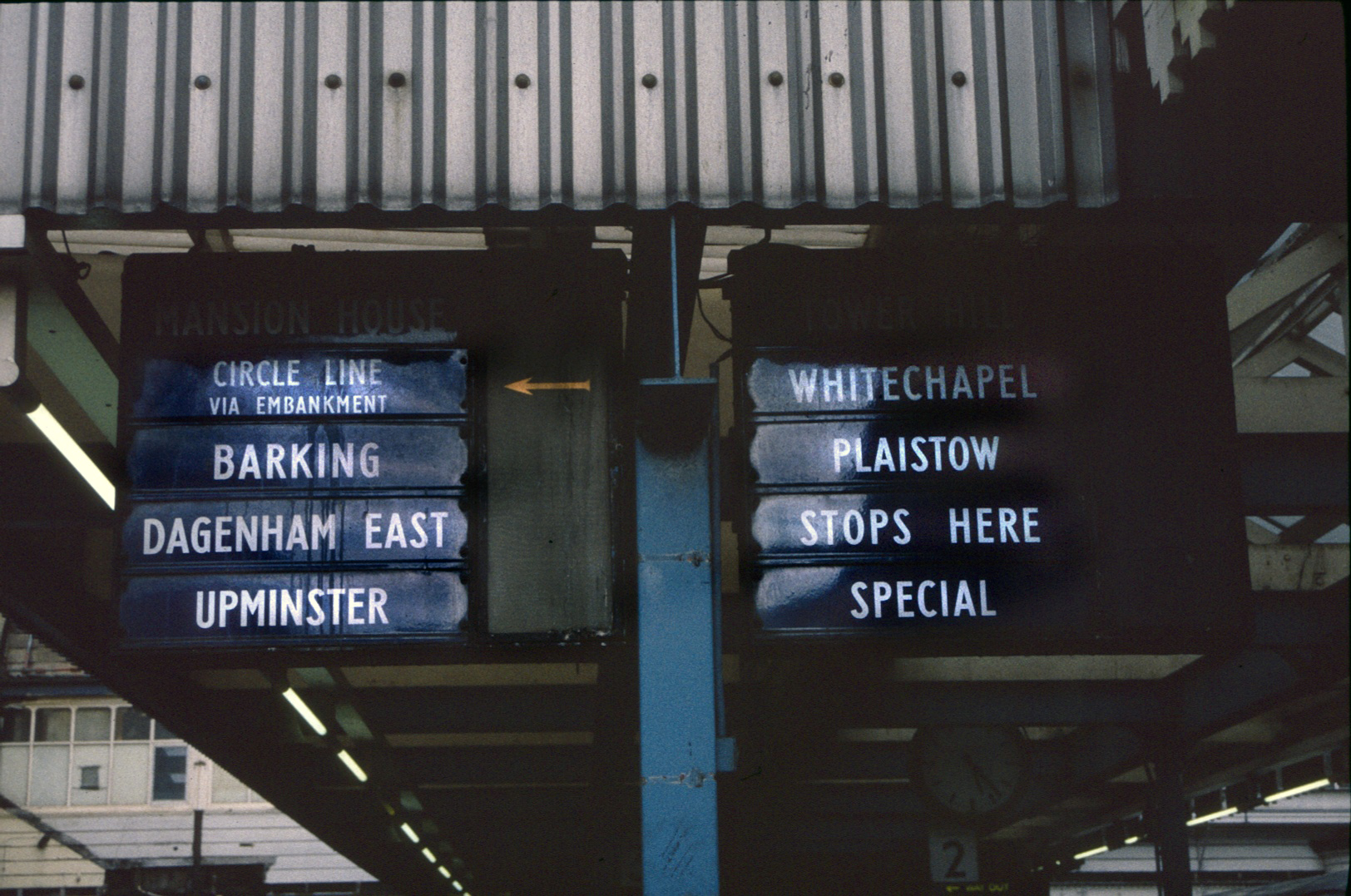
Original train indicators on the island platform in 1988, now removed. The ones on the separate westbound District line platform still survive, but are no longer in use

=== Deep-level station ===
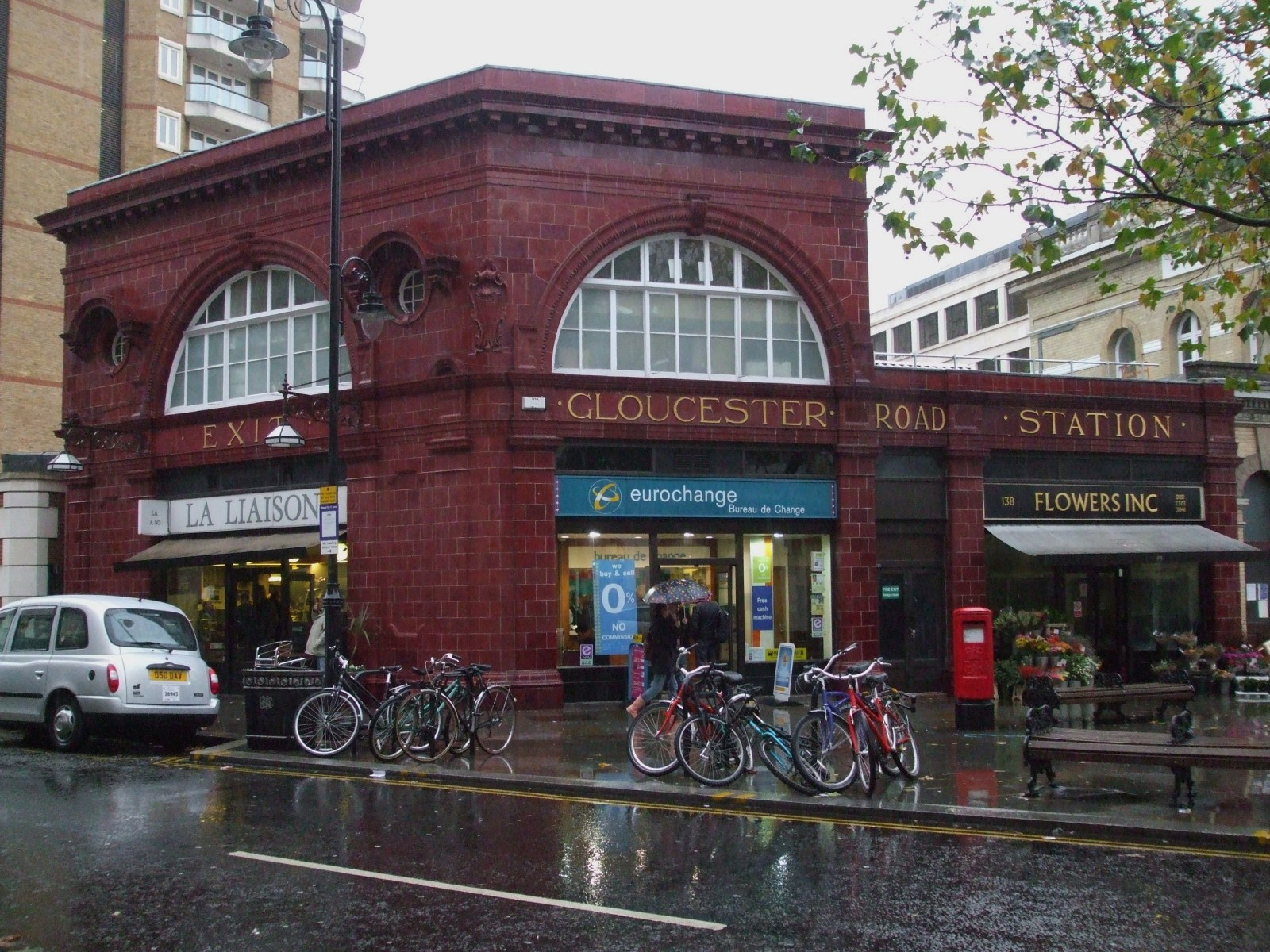
Piccadilly line station building

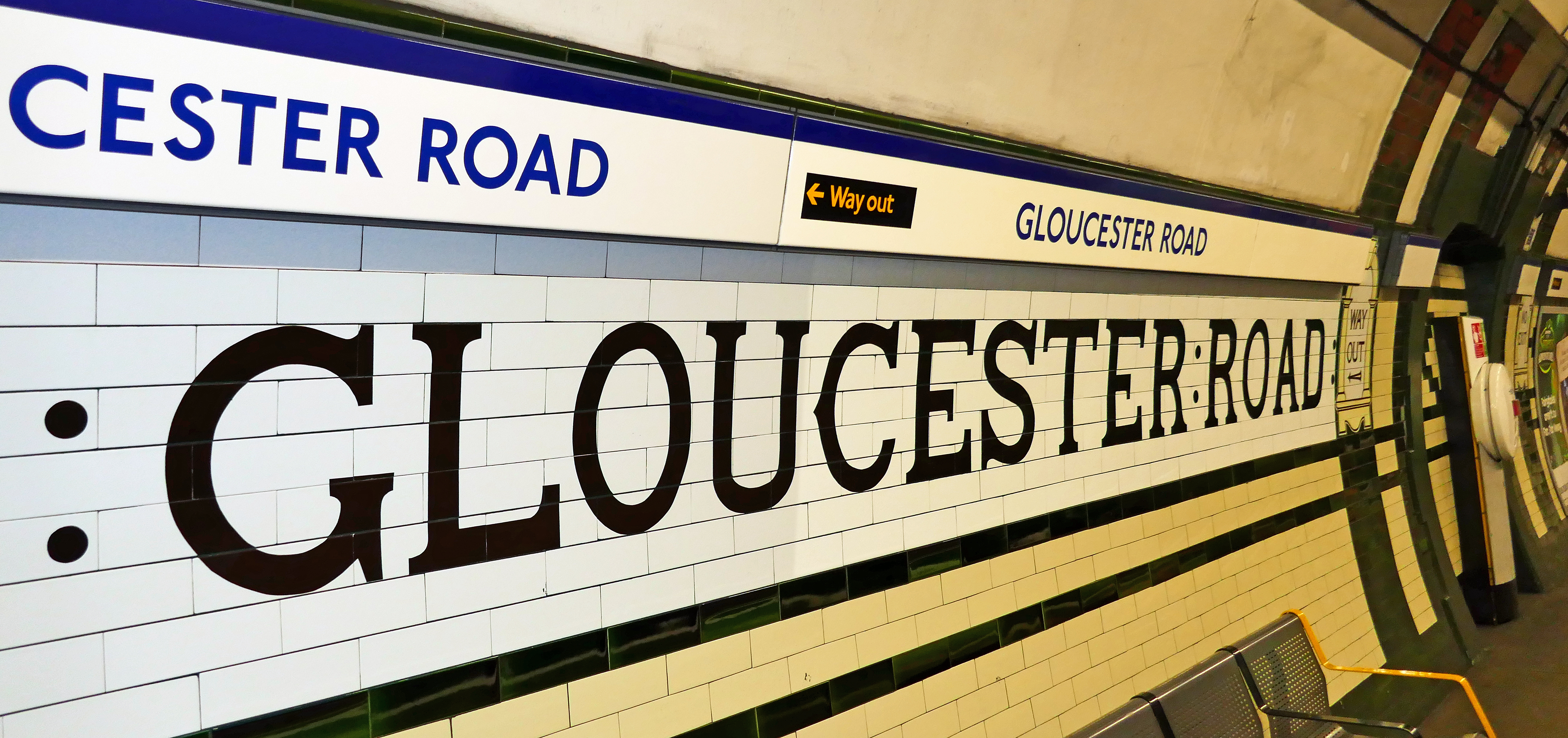
The dark green and cream tiled walls of the Piccadilly line's lower level passages and platforms have been restored.

By the beginning of the 20th century, the DR had been extended to Richmond, Ealing Broadway, Hounslow West and Wimbledon in the west and to New Cross Gate in the east. The southern section of the Inner Circle was suffering considerable congestion between South Kensington and Mansion House, between which stations the DR was running an average of 20 trains per hour with more in the peak periods.

To relieve the congestion, the DR planned an express deep-level tube line starting from a connection to its sub-surface tracks west of Gloucester Road and running to Mansion House. The tunnels were planned to run about 60 to 70 feet (18–21 m) beneath the existing sub-surface route with only one intermediate stop at Charing Cross (now Embankment). Parliamentary approval was obtained in 1897 but no work was done. In 1898, the DR took over the Great Northern, Piccadilly and Brompton Railway#Brompton and Piccadilly Circus Railway, 1896 (B&PCR) which had a route planned from South Kensington to Piccadilly Circus. The route was modified to join the DR deep-level route at South Kensington.

Following the purchase of the DR by the Underground Electric Railways Company of London in 1902, the planned DR and B&PCR lines were merged with a third proposed route from the Great Northern, Piccadilly and Brompton Railway#Great Northern and Strand Railway, 1898. The DR deep-level route was revised at its western end to continue to Earl's Court and surface to the east of Barons Court. The deep-level platforms were opened on 15 December 1906 by the Great Northern, Piccadilly and Brompton Railway (GNP&BR, now the Piccadilly line) which ran between Finsbury Park and Hammersmith. A new surface building for the lifts was designed by Leslie Green with the GNP&BR's distinctive ox-blood red glazed terracotta façade.

As part of the development over the sub-surface platforms, the station buildings were remodelled internally to share a single entrance and ticket office. Space in the Piccadilly line building that was formerly used for operational purposes or as the exit to the street is now used for retail purposes. During the 2000s, the deep-level parts of the station underwent refurbishment with areas of damaged wall tiles being replaced. The dark green and cream tiled walls of the Piccadilly line's lower level passages and platforms were restored, with damaged tiles being replaced by reproductions to match the original designs.

On 24 May 1957, Teresa Lubienska, a Polish Countess who had survived Auschwitz concentration camp, was stabbed five times on the eastbound Piccadilly line platform and died shortly afterwards. A cry of the word bandits was heard by a station worker and she was escorted to St Mary Abbots Hospitial, where she died soon after. Her murder remains unsolved to this day.

== Artwork on disused platform ==
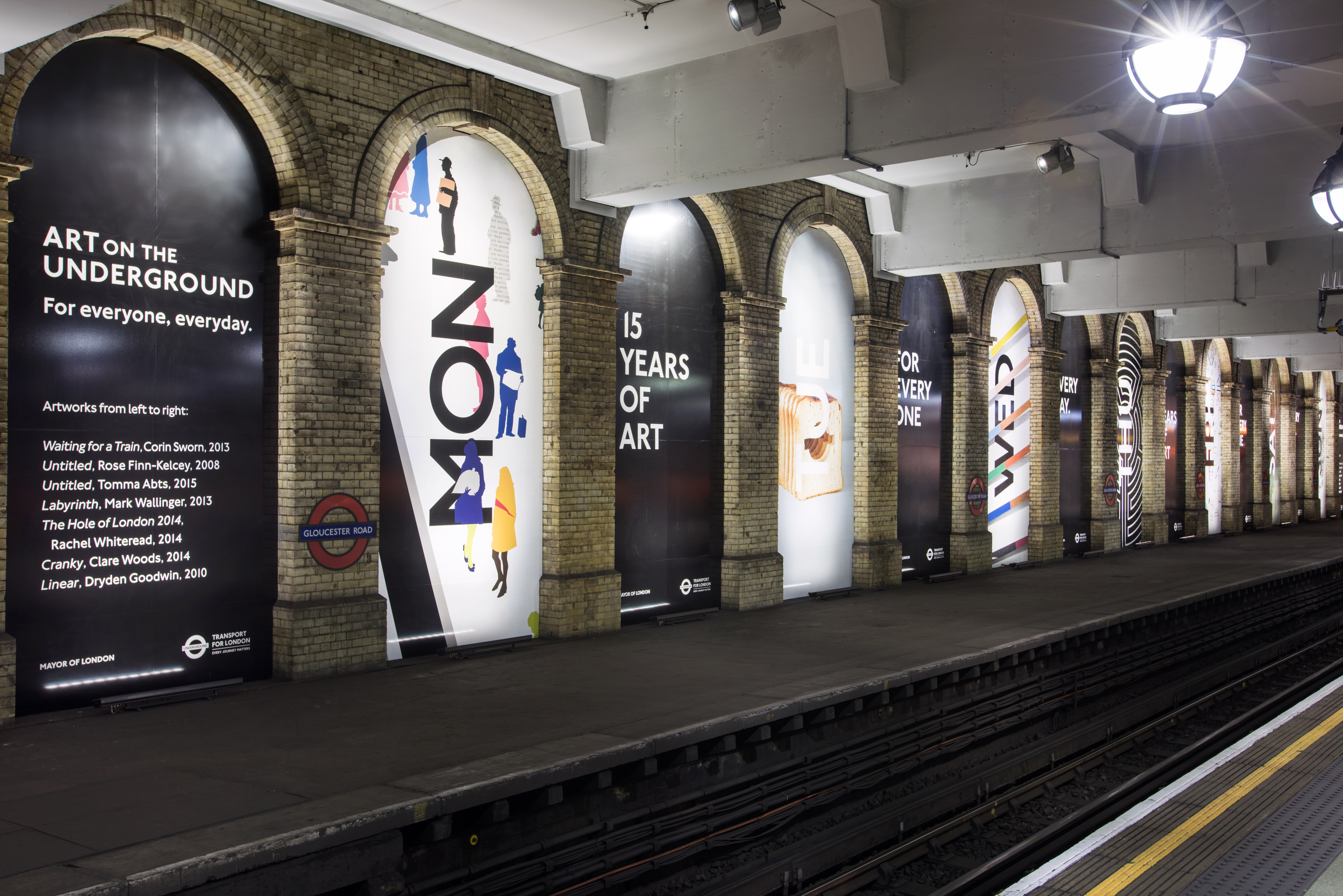
Murals celebrating the various works by Art on the Underground on the disused platform

In 2000, the disused eastbound platform was suggested as a location for temporary art installations, with artworks located in the brick recesses in the northern retaining wall. Platform for Art, and subsequently Art on the Underground have used the disused platform for temporary installations of sculptures, murals or photographs. Artworks have been by a variety of artists over the past 20 years, including David Shrigley, Chiho Aoshima and Heather Phillipson.

== Services ==
Gloucester Road station is on the Circle, District and Piccadilly lines in London fare zone 1. On the District and Piccadilly lines, the station is between Earl's Court and South Kensington. On the Circle line, it is between South Kensington and High Street Kensington. Gloucester Road is the westernmost interchange between these three lines, although the tube map promotes the easier interchange at South Kensington.

Train frequencies vary throughout the day, but generally District line trains operate every 2–6 minutes throughout the day; supplemented by Circle line trains every 8–12 minutes. Piccadilly line trains operate every 2–6 minutes throughout the day, and operates a 24-hour Night Tube service on Fridays and Saturdays.

Preceding station	London Underground	Following station
High Street Kensington towards Edgware Road	Circle line	South Kensington towards Hammersmith via Tower Hill
Earl's Court towards Wimbledon, Richmond or Ealing Broadway	District line	South Kensington towards Upminster
Earl's Court towards Uxbridge, Rayners Lane or Heathrow Airport (Terminal 4 or Terminal 5)	Piccadilly line	South Kensington towards Cockfosters or Arnos Grove

== Connections ==
London Buses day and night routes serve the station.

== Notes and references ==
=== Bibliography ===
- Badsey-Ellis, Antony (2005). London's Lost Tube Schemes. Capital Transport. ISBN 1-85414-293-3.
- Hobhouse, Hermione, ed. (1986). "CHAPTER XXIV - Southern Kensington in Retrospect". Survey of London: volume 42: Kensington Square to Earl's Court. English Heritage.
- Horne, Mike (2006). The District Line. Capital Transport. ISBN 1-85414-292-5.
- Rose, Douglas (1999) [1980]. The London Underground, A Diagrammatic History. Douglas Rose/Capital Transport. ISBN 1-85414-219-4.
- Wolmar, Christian (2005) [2004]. The Subterranean Railway: How the London Underground Was Built and How It Changed the City Forever. Atlantic Books. ISBN 1-84354-023-1.
