= Cromwell Curve =

Closed section of the London Underground

Coordinates: 51.4955°N 0.1873°W

The Cromwell Curve was a short section of railway line on the London Underground between Gloucester Road and High Street Kensington stations. The line was opened by the District Railway (DR) on 5 July 1871. The tracks formed a triangle across the end of the ∨ connecting the District's existing routes from Earl's Court station to Gloucester Road and High Street Kensington, and ran in a cutting parallel to the Metropolitan Railway (MR). The name derives from Cromwell Road which is immediately south of the site of the curve.

The track was opened without parliamentary authority in an attempt by the DR to increase its share of the revenues from the Inner Circle (now the Circle line), which were divided on the basis of mileage of track owned by the DR and the MR. Sir John Fowler arbitrated the dispute, ruling on 27 July that Inner Circle receipts were to be divided 67% to the Metropolitan and 33% to the District (revised to 50:50 in 1878, due to increased traffic from the District's western lines). Although the Cromwell Curve was used only occasionally, the dispute between the two companies continued until 1903, when the matter was finally decided in favour of the Metropolitan.

The 240-metre (790 ft) long curve was closed in 1956 and the tracks are no longer in place. In 1957 the site was used for the West London Air Terminal. This closed in 1974 and part of its building is used as a supermarket.

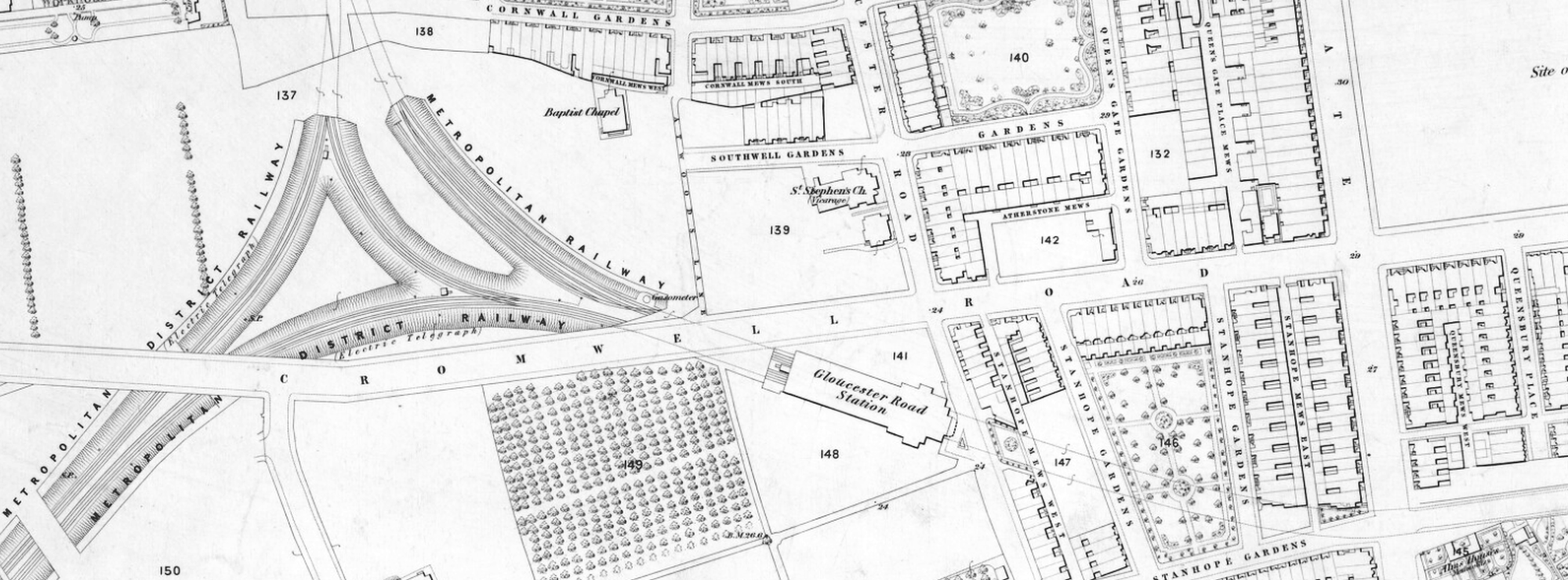
The Cromwell Curve (centre of three cuttings heading north)
