= George Campbell Sherrin =

British architect (1843 – 1909)

- Born: 1843; City of London
- Died: 8 December 1909 (aged 66); Holborn
- Occupation: Architect
- Notable work: 1885–1892 – Spitalfields Market; 1901 – Kursaal

George Campbell Sherrin FRIBA (1843 – 8 December 1909) (also known as George Sherrin and George C. Sherrin) was a British architect. As a consultant architect for the Metropolitan Railway, Sherrin designed many railway buildings, including Moorgate station, and arcades at Liverpool Street station and High Street Kensington tube station. Some of his other notable works include the Old Spitalfields Market and the Kursaal.

== Early years ==
Sherrin was born in the City of London in 1843, and was baptised on the 2 January 1845 at St Ann Blackfriars. He was first articled to Henry Edward Kendall Jr. in 1859, before going onto work as an assistant to Samuel Joseph Nicholl. He became an assistant with John Taylor Junior and worked for ten years in the office of Frederic Chancellor, in Chelmsford, Essex. In 1872 he joined the Architectural Association.

== Career ==
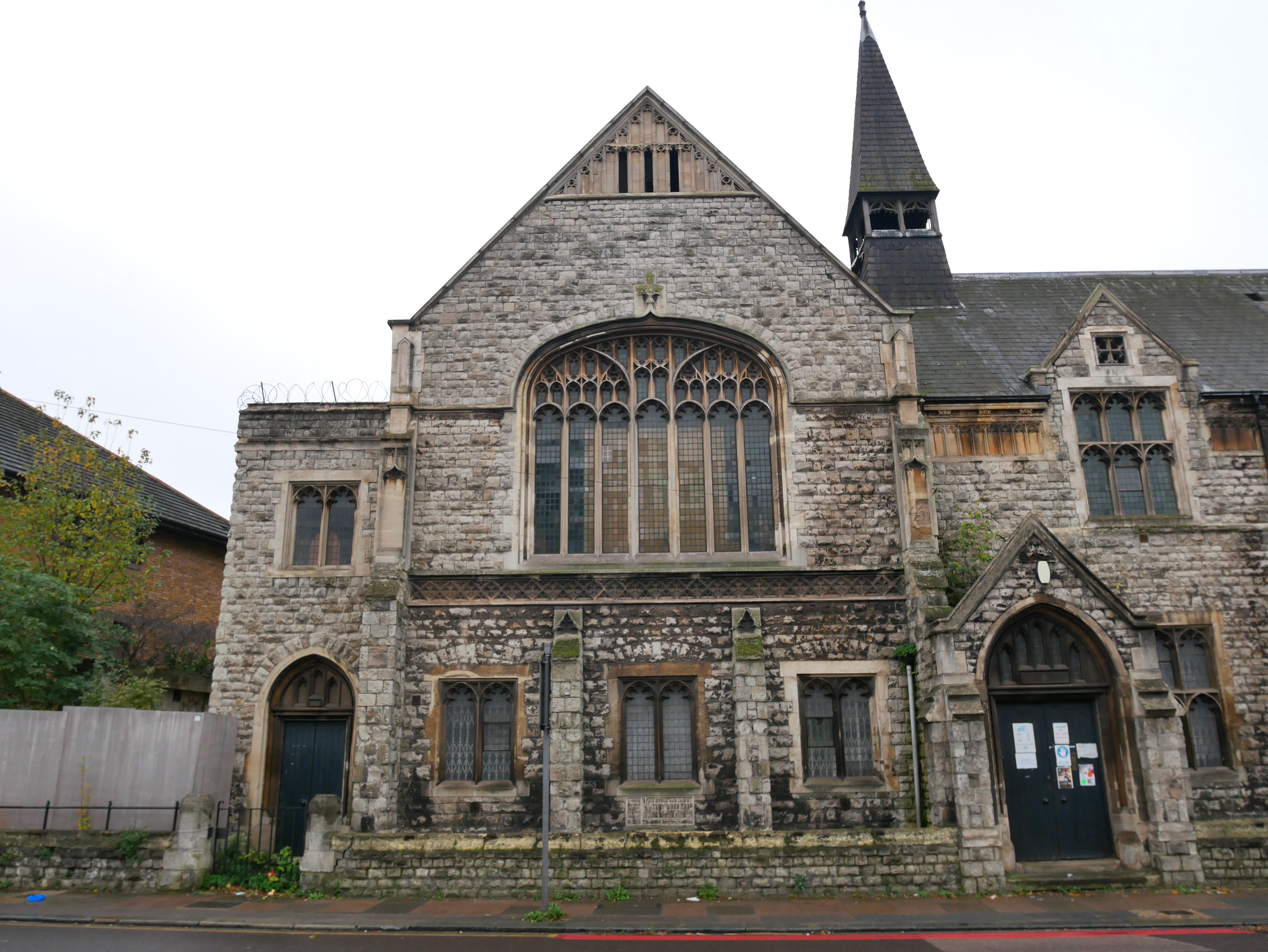
United Reformed Church Sunday School, Lewisham

Sherrin opened his own architectural practice in 1877 in Broad Street, London. The first recorded work from his practice was the United Reformed Church Sunday School in Courthill Road, Lewisham which was completed in 1881 and is now Grade II listed. This year, Sherrin first exhibited at the Royal Academy of Arts, with a design for the Masters House at Woburn Park School, which was the first of five displays at the academy with the last being in 1889. The picture of The Gatehouse, Ingatestone, a house he had designed for himself, was regarded as the best of his exhibited works. In 1882, Sherrin was admitted as an associate member of the Royal Institute of British Architects, and leased several plots of land in Station Road, Ingatestone from the Petre Estate, where his own property, The Gatehouse was built along with Ardtully, Chantry and Redhouse in the Old English style, with them all being completed by 1884. He was also commissioned to design Newlands Hall in the village, which is now Grade II listed. Sherrin would later design the Working Men's Club in Ingatestone in 1888, which is now a community centre. Sherrin's designs for Woburn Park School in Weybridge, including the Masters House (1881), school residence and cricket pavilion (1883) were completed by 1892.

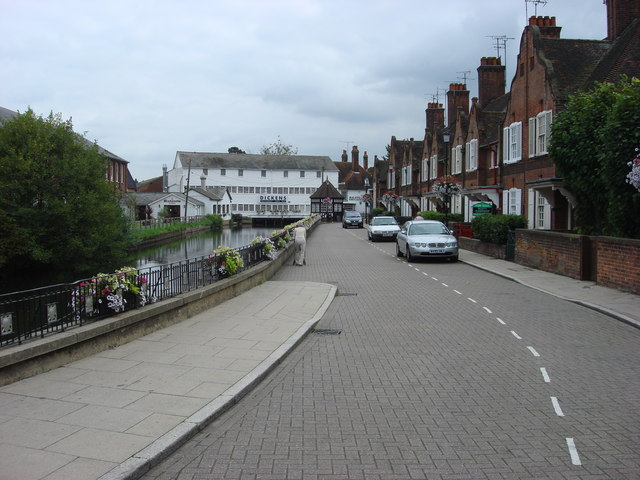
The Causeway, Halstead with Sherrin's cottages on the right

His next works were in Essex, with the Working Men's Club and cottages at the Causeway, Halstead for Samuel Courtauld & Co, the owner of the Townsford Mill, in 1883. The design was shown at the Royal Academy and in British Architect, which opined that "this spirited little drawing and plan, with the large view render a pretty complete idea of this pleasingly-designed row of cottages". The cottages were listed as Grade II in 1994. Sherrin would also design the Working Men's Club in Bocking and the Cottage Hospital in Halstead for Samuel Courtauld & Co. Other work during 1884 included Tilehurst in Mountnessing for Sir Sebastian Petre, which was listed in 1994 as Grade II.

His first major commission in London since Lewisham was in 1885, for the Cannon Street Buildings. In the same year, Robert Horner, owner of Spitalfields Market commissioned Sherrin to design a new market, which would be not be completed until 1892. The market buildings have been listed at Grade II since 1986.

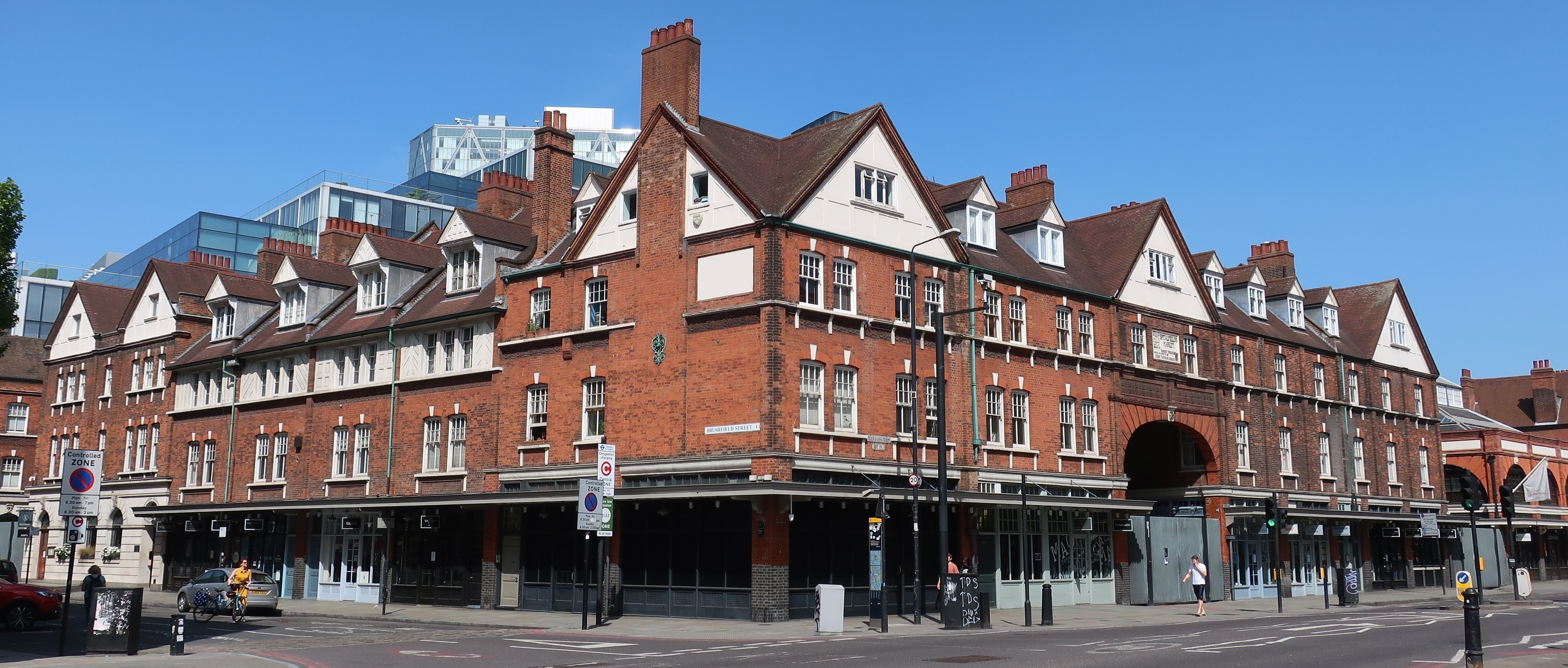
South-east corner of the Horner Buildings, Spitalfields Market constructed in 1887

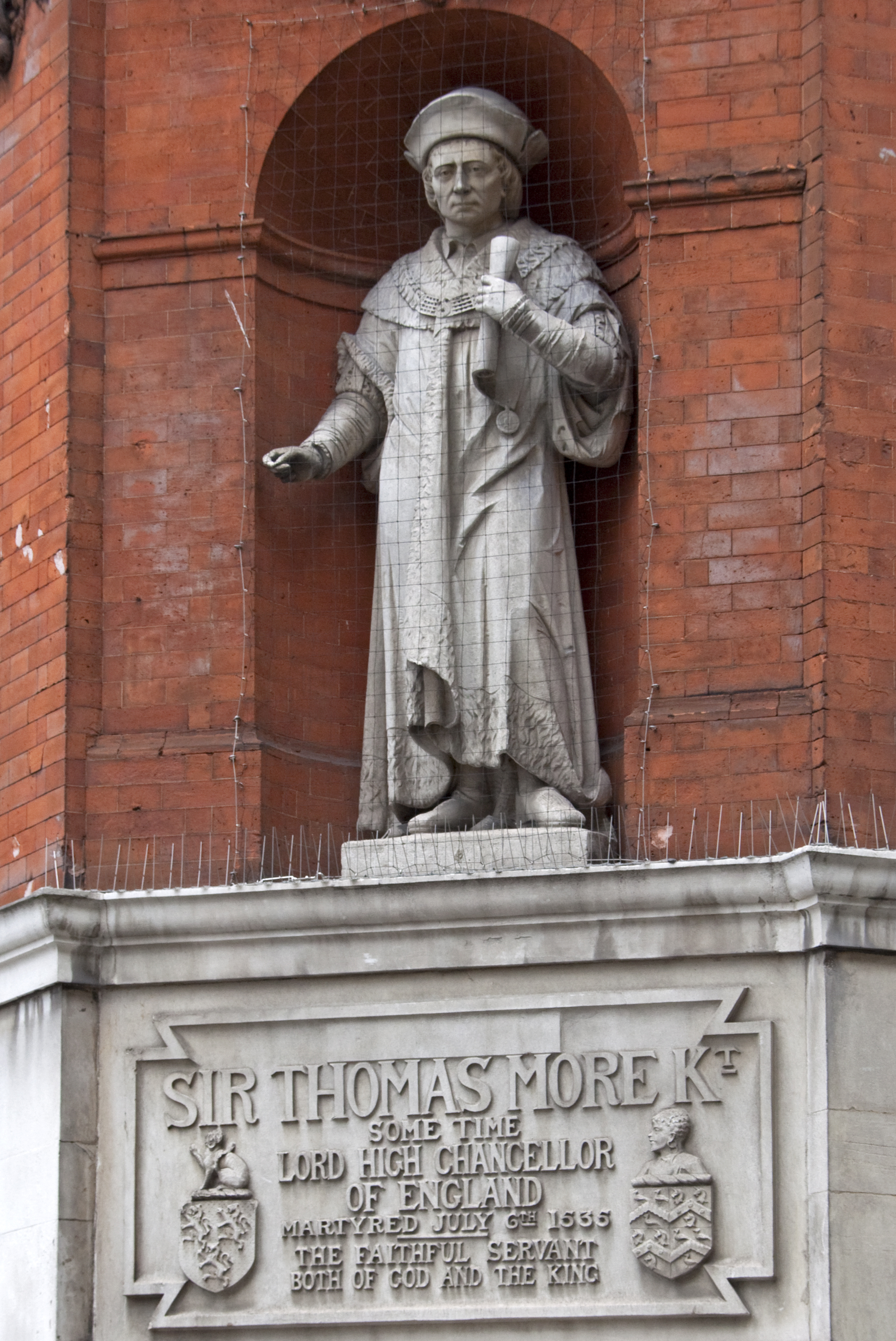
Statue of Sir Thomas More at Sherrin's building in Carey Street, Holborn

In 1886, his work at Thomas More Chambers, 51 and 52 Carey Street, Holborn included a statue of Sir Thomas More designed by Sherrin himself, which was Grade II listed in 1999. Between 1890 and 1891, Sherrin's designs for new buildings at the Catholic Church of St Edward The Confessor in Romford were constructed, funded by the Petre family. In 1892, Sherrin started work on designing new street level buildings for Moorgate station on behalf of the Metropolitan Railway, with work starting in 1893. The new building was single-storey and designed to promote commercial letting space. His work saw him become a consultant architect to the Metropolitan Railway, and he would later return to Moorgate in 1900 to design an office development above his original station building.

In 1894, Sherrin proposed to the fathers of the Brompton Oratory a new design for the unbuilt dome on Herbert Gribble's design. His design was selected, along with his assistant E. A. Rickards who designed the lantern, and the dome was built between 1895 and 1896. He followed up his work for the Catholic church, with his design for the Church of Our Lady of Refuge in Cromer which opened in 1895. During 1894, Sherrin designs for the rebuilding of the east wing of Thorndon Hall into a separate home were completed for the Petre family. In 1896, Sherrin redesigned 2 Chelsea Embankment, for Robert Strutt, 4th Baron Rayleigh who subsequently renamed the building Rayleigh House. The building was Grade II listed in 2020. During 1897, his designs for Farnborough Town Hall was built, which was listed in 1981, while he designed an orphanage at Holly Place, Hampstead.

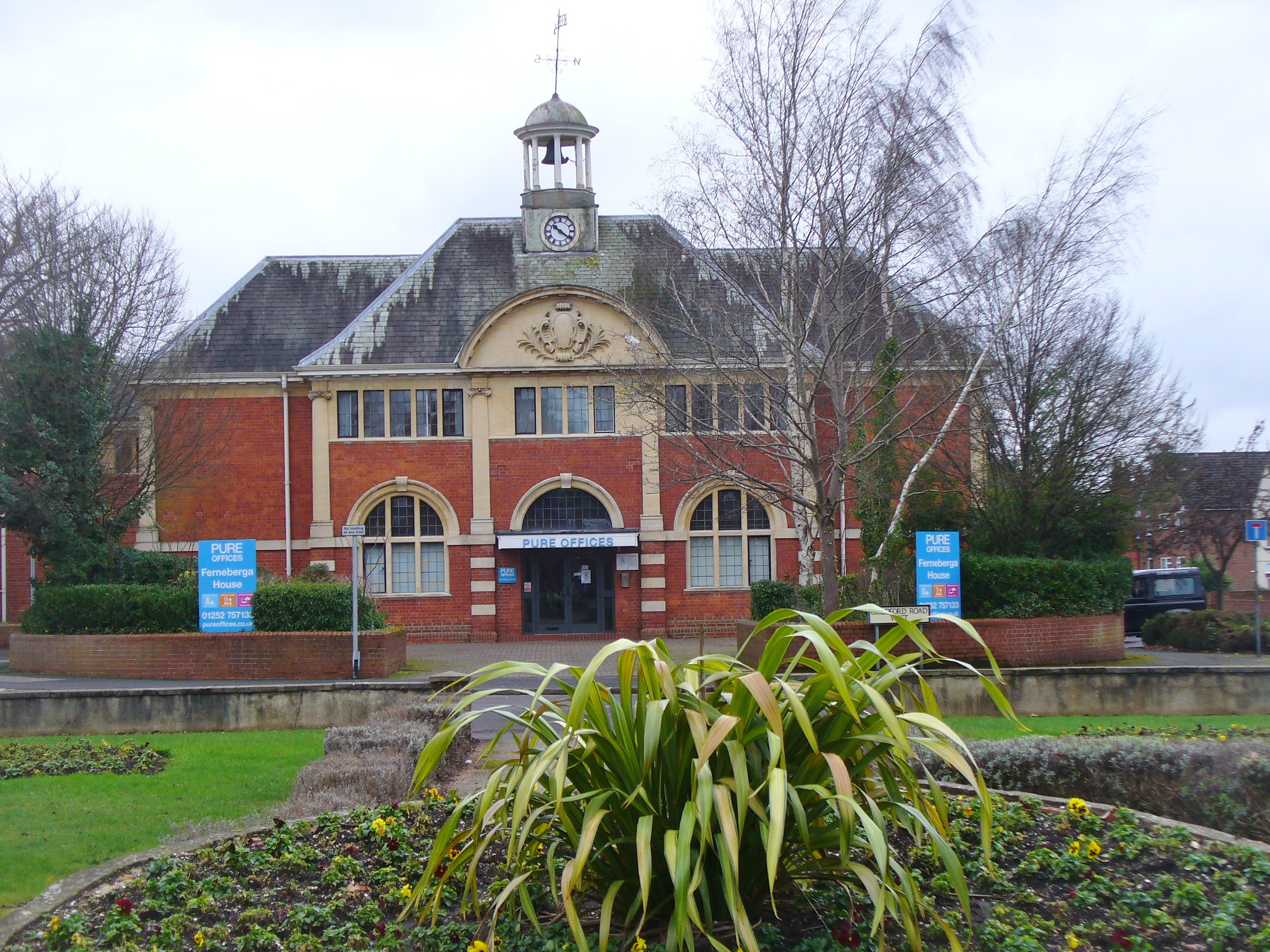
1897 Farnborough Town Hall by Sherrin

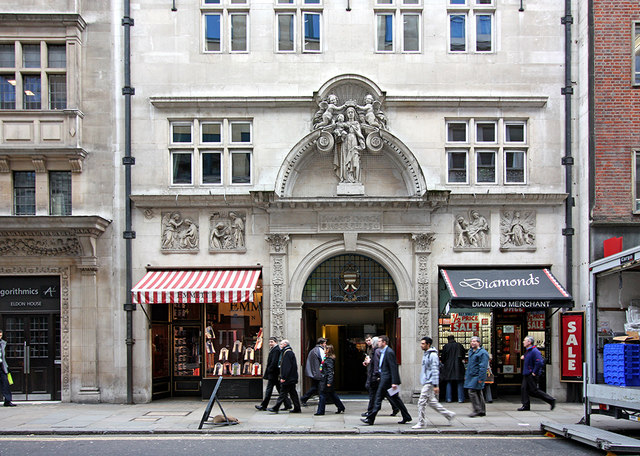
St Mary Moorfields

Sherrin was elected as a fellow of the Royal Institute of British Architects in 1898, the same year that he started work on designing one of the world's first amusement parks, the Kursaal in Southend-on-Sea, which opened in 1902. In 1899, Sherrin designed the new church of St Mary Moorfields to replace the former church designed by John Newman, which was demolished due to building of the Metropolitan Railway. The site was difficult as the entrance had to be fitted amongst shop fronts, but the building opened in 1903. The British Architect acknowledged the site's constraints, but continued:

However, it has not only been built, but is, moreover carried out in such an excellent way that the idea of limitations or difficulty does not occur to one, or, if so, it only suggests that the architect has traded on his difficulties to his own good!

In the same year, Sherrin designed 84 Piccadilly, which would become the home of the Imperial Service Club. Back in Essex, he designed extensions to St Mary Immaculate and the Holy Archangel in Kelvedon and designed the Alexander Hotel in Marine Parade, Dovercourt built-in 1903.

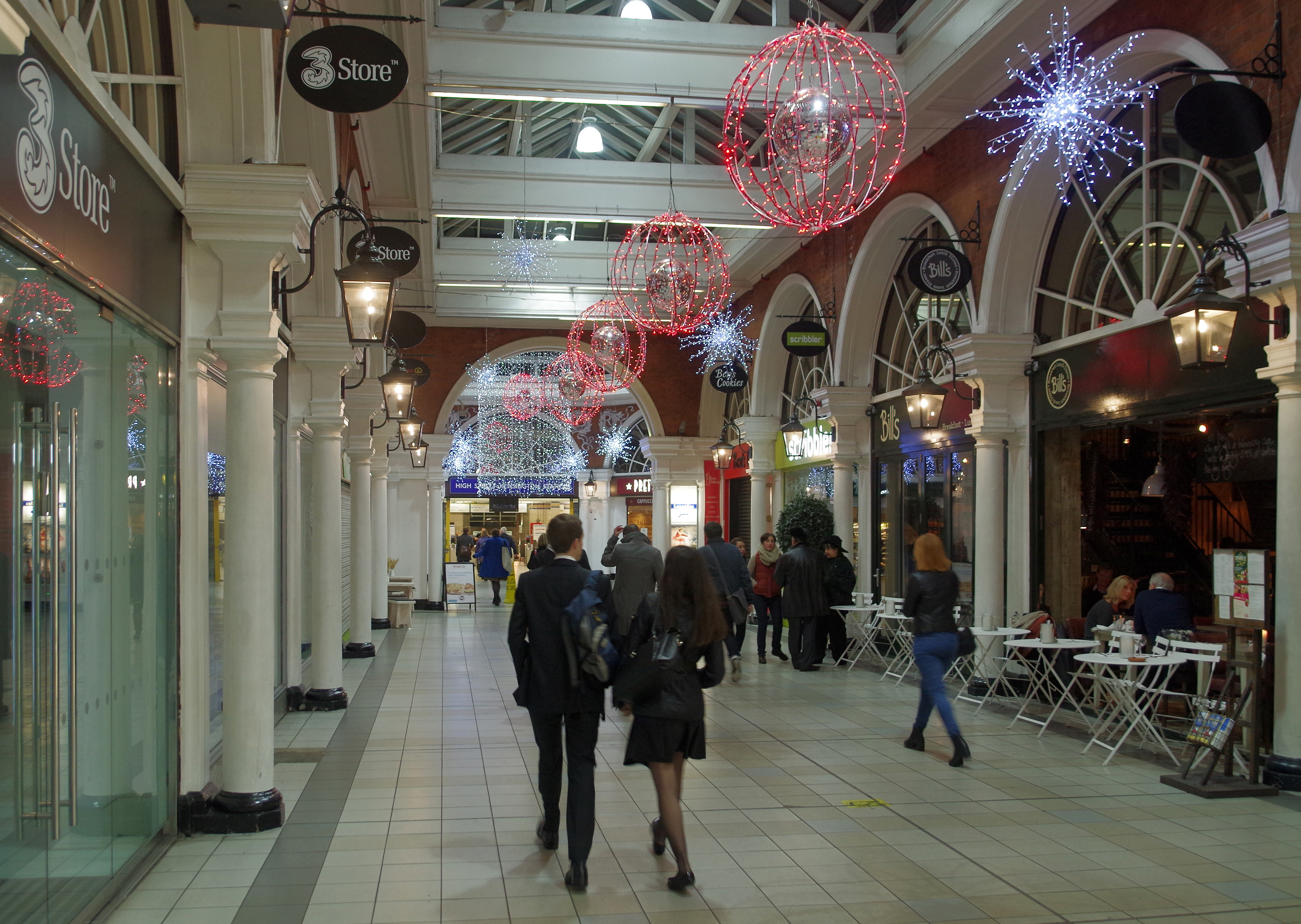
The arcade at High Street Kensington Tube station

Sherrin's workload for the Metropolitan Railway grew considerably after 1900. He was employed to redesigned High Street Kensington tube station which had been designed by Sir John Fowler, during 1903–1904. His plan involved removing Fowler's original platform roof, and replacing it with simpler wooden covers on iron columns, so a superstructure could be built over the tracks at the northern end. This new structure held a new octagonal booking hall, which led to the High Street with a new arcade that the department stores Pontings and Derry & Toms occupied. His work for South Kensington tube station was completed at the same time, where he designed a new art deco entrance with an arcade and a new ticket hall and the addition of canopies over the platforms. Sherrin would also complete a redesign for Gloucester Road tube station including removing the barrel platform roof, which was completed coetaneous. In 1909, Sherrin's redesign for Monument station was completed, which included a new entrance incorporating commercial space where the booking hall had previously been located, while Mark Lane Station ground level buildings were completed to Sherrin's design, as was his new entrance and arcade for the District line Victoria Station entrance.

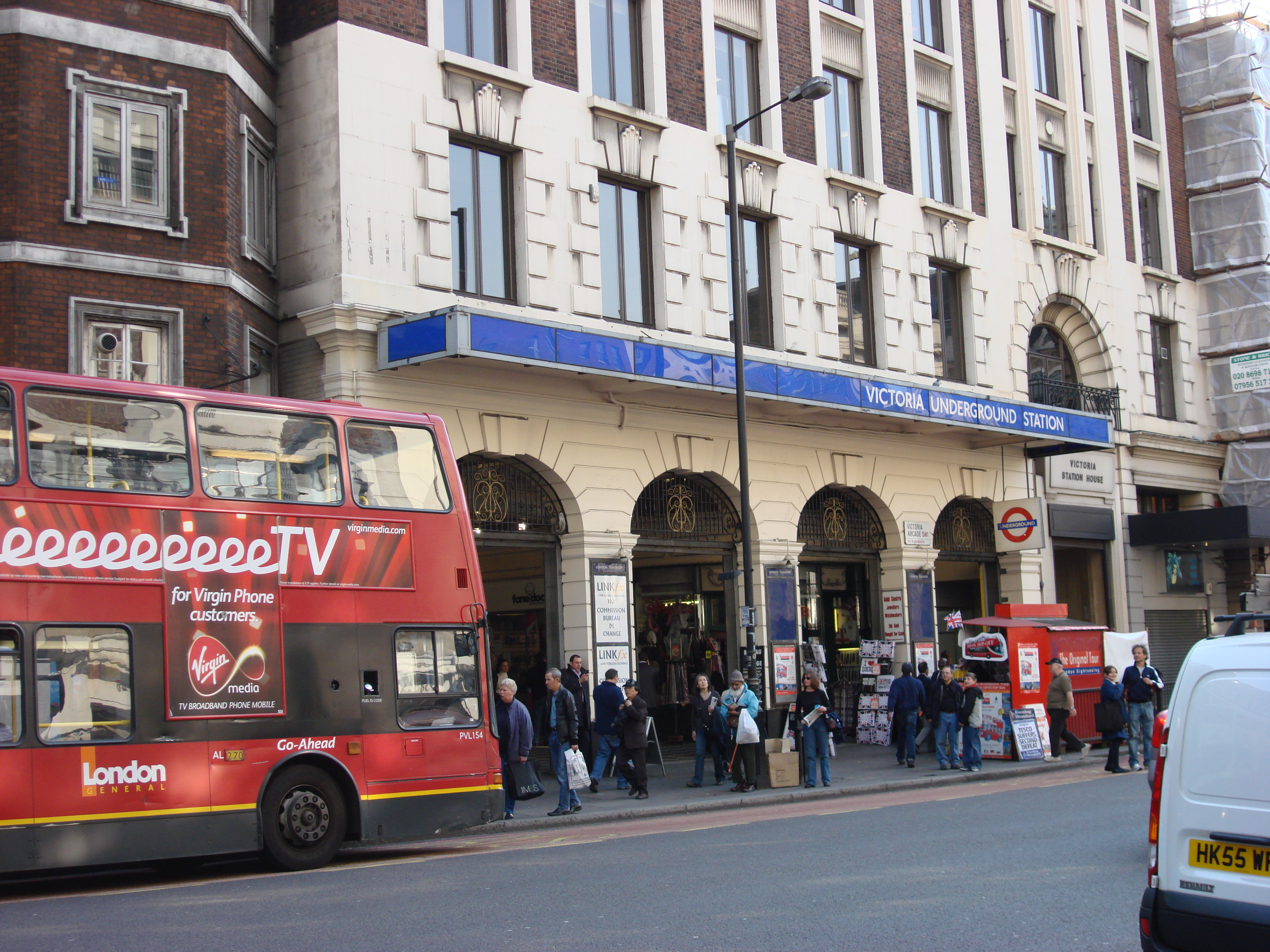
Victoria Underground Station. The ground floor colonnade was Sherrin's design

Sherrin would go on to do further designs for the Metropolitan Railway, however these were completed after his death, being overseen by his son Frank. These included the redesign of Edgware Road with a new entrance on Marylebone Road in 1911, a new arcade at Liverpool Street in 1912, redesign of King Cross Metropolitan Railway station between 1912–13 and Finchley Road in 1915.

== Personal life and death ==
Sherrin was a member of the Royal Institute of British Architects Art Committee and the Burlington Fine Arts Club. He was married and had three daughters and three sons, with his son Frank also becoming an architect like his father and completing Sherrin's work after his death. Sherrin died in Holborn on 8 December 1909 with a funeral service being held at St. Mary's, Moorfields on 13 December.

== See also ==
- The Architecture the Railways Built, UKTV 2020 documentary series
