= Farnborough Town Hall =

Municipal building in Farnborough, Hampshire, England

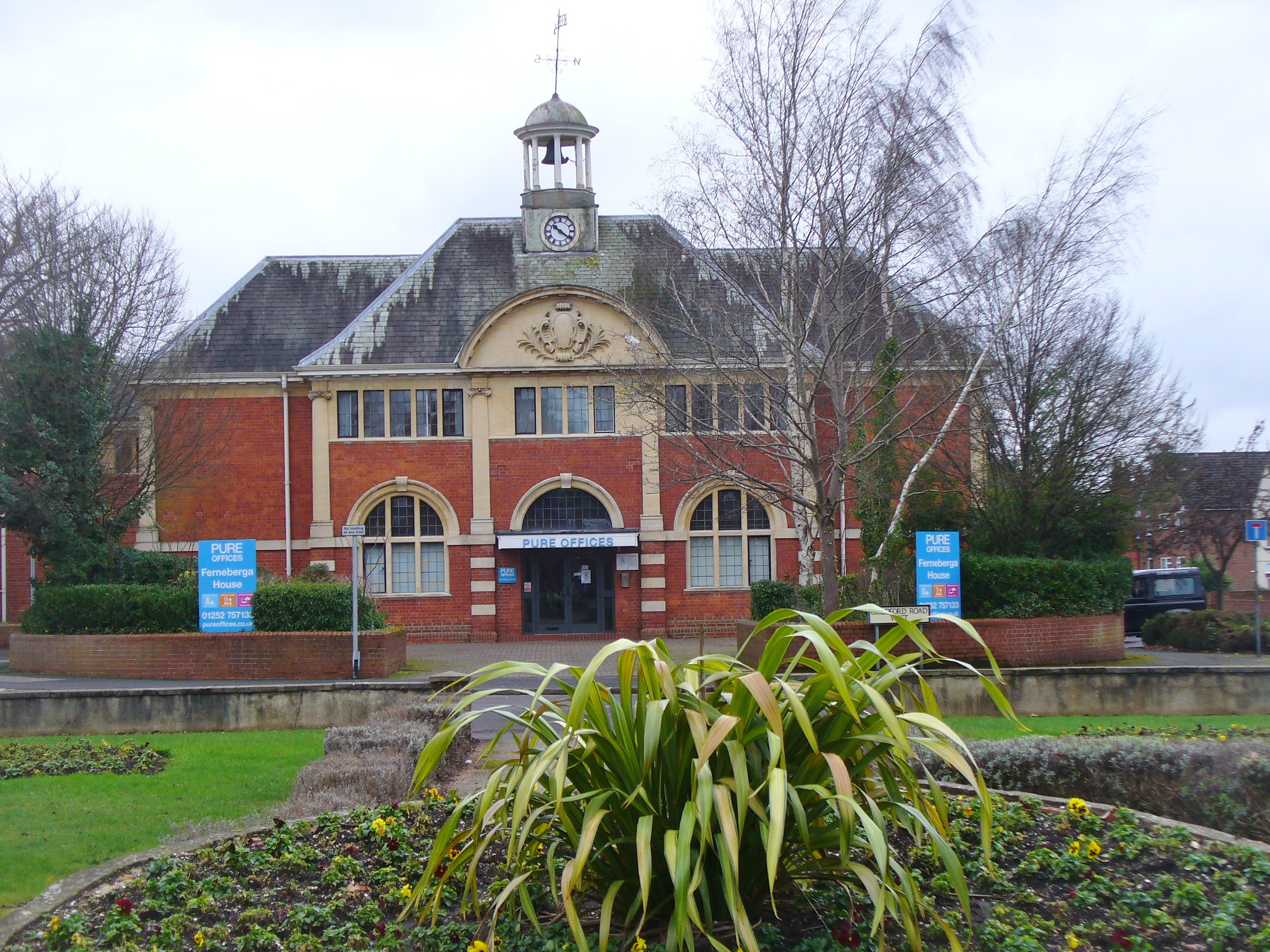
- Farnborough Town Hall

- Shown in Hampshire
- 51.2799°N 0.7515°W
- Location: Alexandra Road, Farnborough

History
- Built: 1897

Site notes
- Architect: George Campbell Sherrin
- Architectural style: Neoclassical style

Listed Building – Grade II
- Official name: Farnborough Town Hall
- Designated: 9 October 1981
- Reference no.: 1303102

Farnborough Town Hall is a municipal building in Alexandra Road, Farnborough, Hampshire, England. The town hall, which was the headquarters of Farnborough Urban District Council, is a Grade II listed building.

== History ==
Following significant population growth associated with the rebuilding of the North Camp in 1890, the area became an urban district in 1896. In this context, the new council decided to procure a dedicated town hall; the site they selected was open land to the west of Alexandra Road.

The new building was designed by George Campbell Sherrin in the neoclassical style, built in red brick with Bath stone dressings and was completed in 1897. The design involved a symmetrical main frontage with five bays facing onto Alexandra Road; the central section of three bays, which slightly projected forward, featured an arched doorway in the centre bay and arched windows in the other bays flanked by full-height Ionic order pilasters. There were groups of narrow casement windows on the first floor and a segmental pediment containing a carving above. It had a steep hip roof topped by a cupola, with a weather vane at the apex. On 14 April 1920 a reception was held in the town hall for 283 returning service personnel who enjoyed a dinner and received a certificate of appreciation for their service in the First World War.

Following the demolition of the concert hall at the Royal Aircraft Establishment, the Farnborough Symphony Orchestra, which had been founded by the scientist, Ben Lockspeiser in 1922, started using the town hall as its main venue in the 1930s. The Farnborough Amateur Operatic Society also used the town hall to perform Gilbert and Sullivan operettas in the inter-war era. During the Second World War the town hall was requisitioned for use as a civil defence centre. A clock was added to the turret in 1950, which struck the hours on a bell mounted above; it was installed by Charles H. Potts & Co. The building was a popular concert venue in the 1960s: performers included the rock band, The Who, in June 1965.

The building continued to serve as the headquarters of Farnborough Urban District Council for much of the 20th century and remained the local seat of government of the enlarged Rushmoor Council, which was formed in 1974, until it moved to the new civic offices, erected just under a mile to the north of the town hall in the early 1980s. Shortly before the council left the building, the Queen Alexandra's Royal Army Nursing Corps was awarded the Freedom of the Borough of Rushmoor and exercised their right to march past the town hall on 29 May 1981. The town hall was subsequently converted for commercial use and was renamed "Fernberga House". (Note: The 11th century word "Ferneberga" is the origin of the name "Farnborough".)
