= High Street Kensington tube station =

London Underground station

High Street Kensington
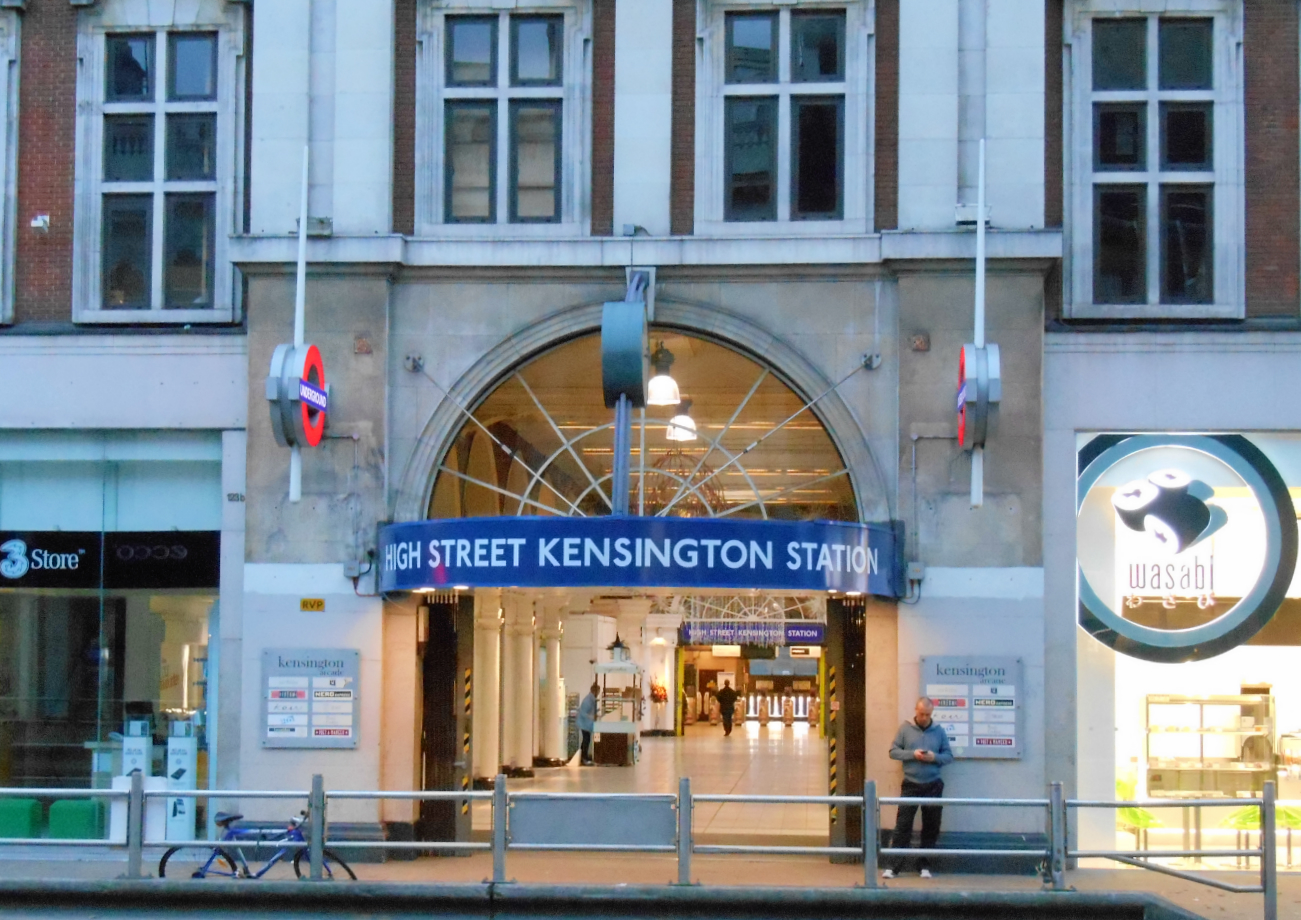
- The station entrance through Kensington Arcade
- Interactive map of High Street Kensington

General information
- Location: Kensington High Street
- Local authority: Royal Borough of Kensington and Chelsea
- Managed by: London Underground
- Number of platforms: 4
- Fare zone: 1

London Underground annual entry and exit
- 2020: ▼3.57 million
- 2021: ▲4.45 million
- 2022: ▲8.54 million
- 2023: ▲9.41 million
- 2024: ▲10.20 million

Key dates
- 1 October 1868: Opened
- 25 November 1963: Goods yard closed

Other information
- External links: TfL station info page
- Coordinates: 51.5008°N 0.1925°W

High Street Kensington is a London Underground station on Kensington High Street, Kensington. It is served by the Circle and District lines, and is in London fare zone 1. On the Circle line, the station is between Gloucester Road and Notting Hill Gate stations. On the Edgware Road branch of the District line, it is between Earl's Court and Notting Hill Gate stations. Kensington Arcade forms the entrance to the station.

== History ==
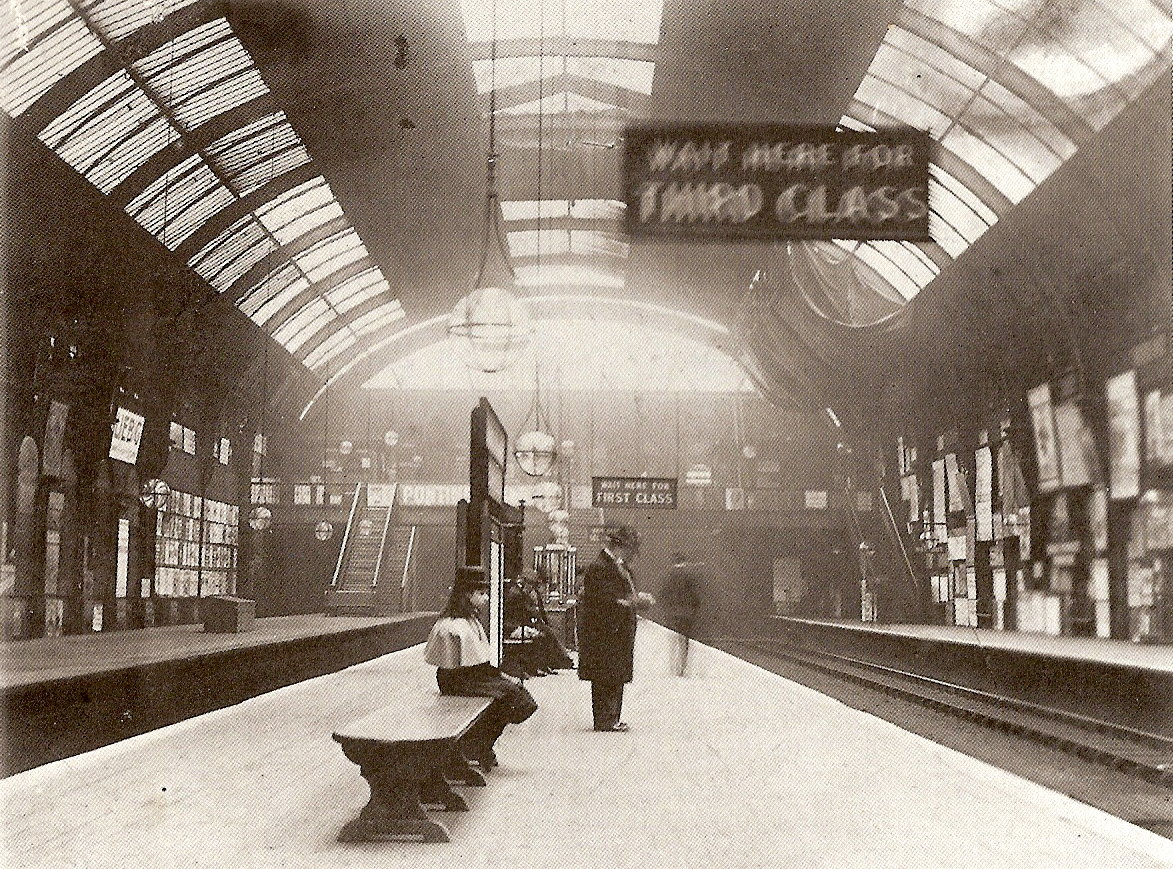
The station's platforms in 1892

The station was originally built by the Metropolitan Railway after parliament passed the Metropolitan Railway's and Metropolitan District Railway's Bill in 1864. Work started in 1865, and in 1867 a barrel roof enclosed the station designed by the Metropolitan Railway's engineer Sir John Fowler. The station, originally titled Kensington Station, had four lines, two for the Metropolitan Railway and two for the Metropolitan District Railway. The station was further redeveloped under the plans of the Metropolitan Railway's consultant architect, George Campbell Sherrin, between 1906 and 1907. Sherrin's designs saw the barrel roof taken off with the platforms covered by plain wooden shelters on iron columns. The north end of the platforms saw a new superstructure built over them, which contained a new octagonal booking hall, and an arcade that led to the High Street. The space in the arcade was taken by neighbouring department stores Pontings and Derry & Toms. The octagonal booking hall was rebuilt by London Transport in 1937–1938 to increase its capacity.

== Station layout ==
The station itself has four platforms – two through platforms and two bay platforms. Platform 1 is used for anticlockwise Circle line and westbound District line trains towards Gloucester Road and Earl's Court respectively. Platform 2 is for clockwise Circle line and eastbound District line trains towards Edgware Road. Platforms 3 and 4 are used for terminating District line trains from Earl's Court. Platform 3 is usually used for the Olympia service, which runs weekends and for special events, and platform 4 is usually only used at the start and end of the day. There used to be a waiting room between Platform 2 and 3 for customer use, but this was turned into a staff room for drivers shortly before the Circle line extension to Hammersmith was implemented in December 2009.

On Platform 3, westbound, there is one of the few surviving K8 telephone kiosks. Now used for the TfL internal system, the kiosk is Grade II listed.

Just south of the station is the junction where the Circle and District lines diverge.

== Services ==
High Street Kensington station is on the Circle and District lines in London fare zone 1. On the Circle line, the station is between Gloucester Road and Notting Hill Gate. On the Edgware Road branch of the District line, it is between Earl's Court and Notting Hill Gate.

The typical off-peak service from this station is:

- 12 tph (trains per hour) to Edgware Road via Paddington (6 tph District line, 6 tph Circle line)
- 6 tph to Wimbledon via Earl's Court (District line)
- 6 tph anticlockwise on the Circle line via Victoria and Embankment to Hammersmith

Weekends and Special Events only:

- 3 tph to Kensington (Olympia) via Earl's Court (District line)

== Connections ==
London Buses day and nighttime routes serve the station.

== See also ==
- Cromwell Curve

Preceding station	London Underground	Following station
Gloucester Road towards Hammersmith via Tower Hill	Circle line	Notting Hill Gate towards Edgware Road
Earl's Court towards Wimbledon	District line Edgware Road branch	Notting Hill Gate towards Edgware Road
Earl's Court towards Ealing Broadway or Kensington (Olympia)	District line	Terminus
