= Earl's Court tube station =

London Underground station

Earl's Court
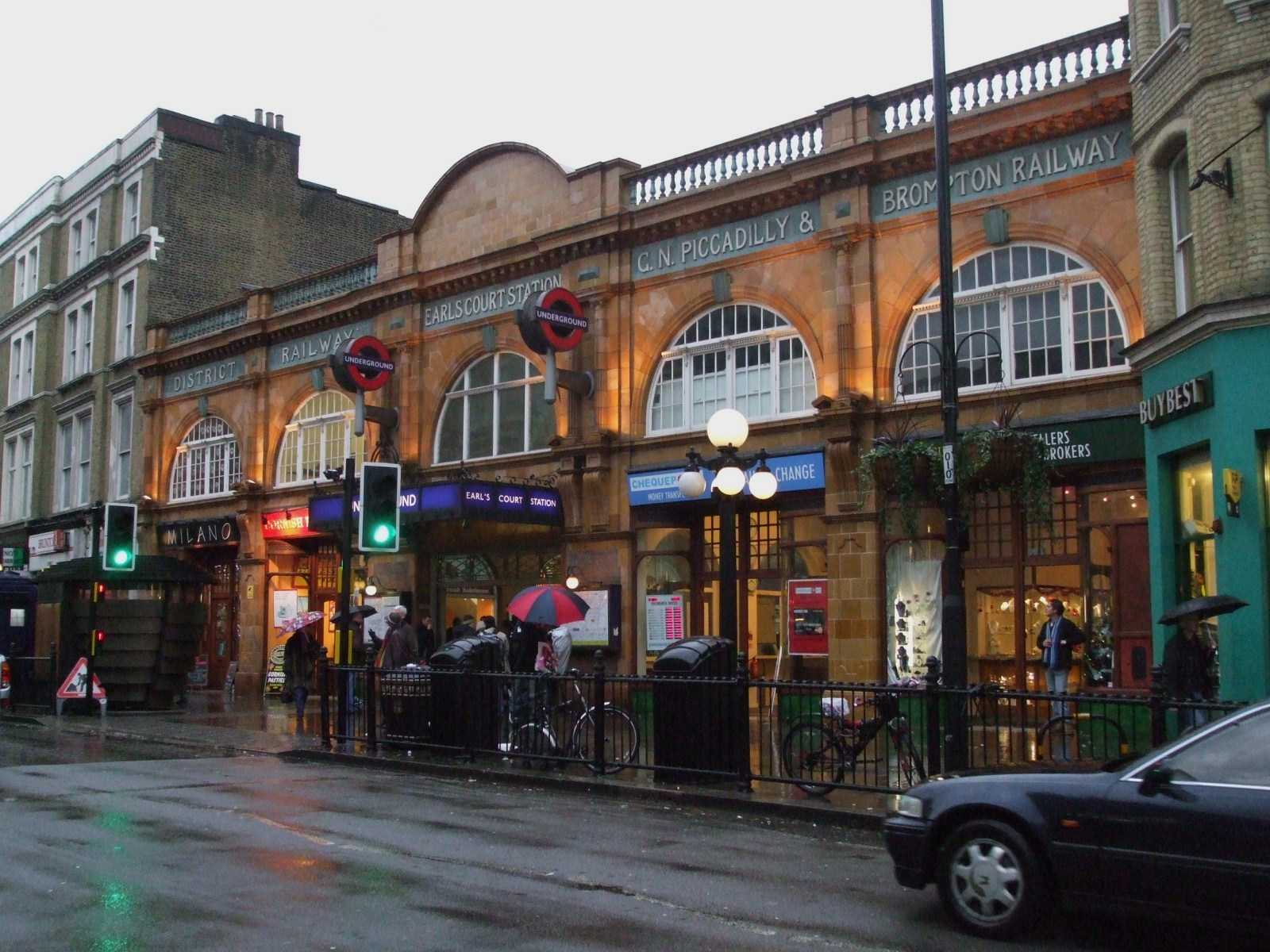
- Eastern station entrance
- Interactive map of Earl's Court

General information
- Location: Earl's Court
- Local authority: Royal Borough of Kensington and Chelsea
- Managed by: London Underground
- Number of platforms: 6
- Accessible: Yes
- Fare zone: 1 and 2

London Underground annual entry and exit
- 2020: ▼7.90 million
- 2021: ▲8.40 million
- 2022: ▲15.18 million
- 2023: ▲15.78 million
- 2024: ▲16.59 million

Key dates
- 30 October 1871: Opened (District)
- 15 December 1906: Opened (Piccadilly)

Listed status
- Listing grade: II
- Entry number: 1358162
- Added to list: 7 November 1984; 41 years ago

Other information
- External links: TfL station info page
- Coordinates: 51.4913°N 0.1947°W

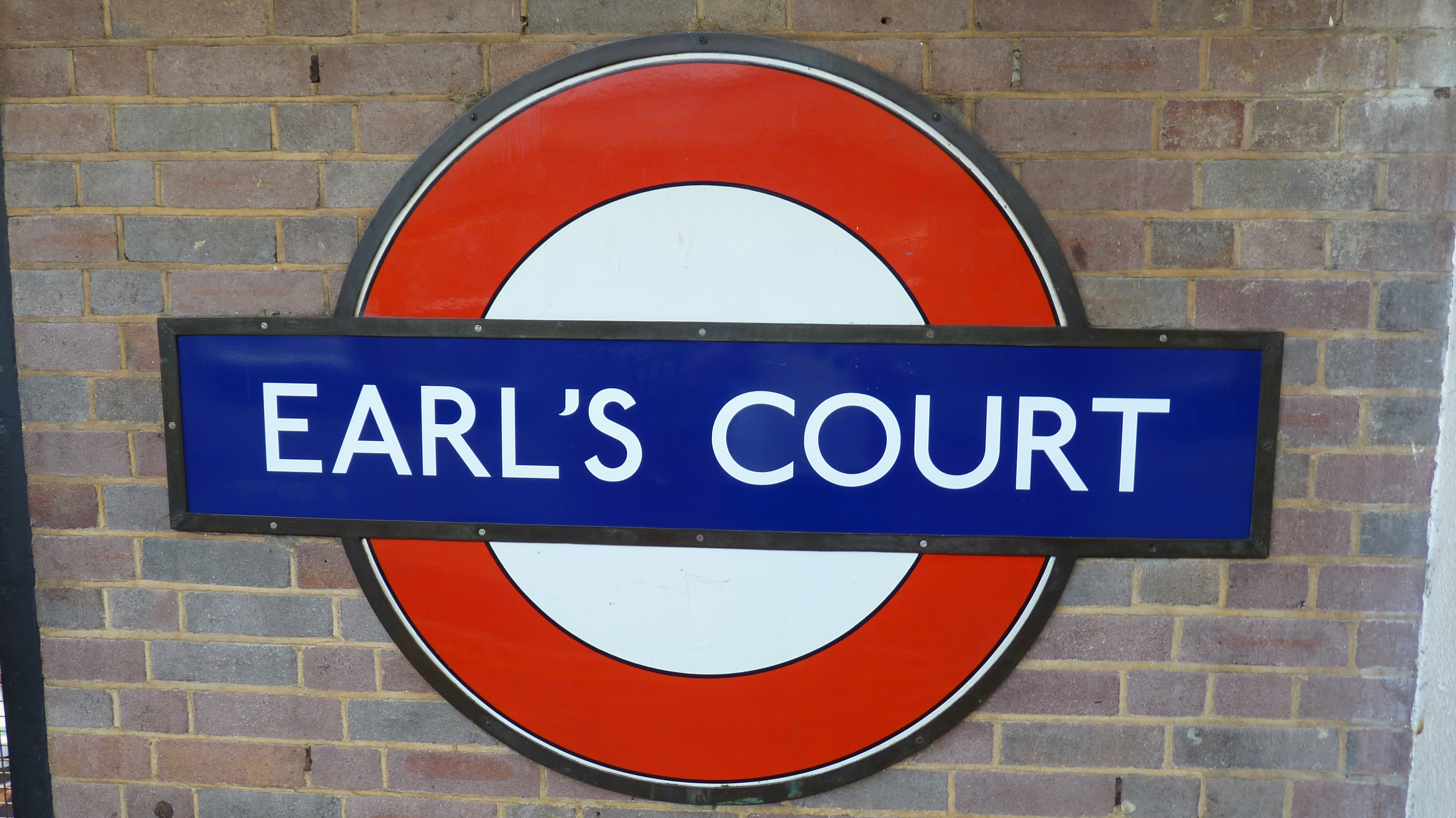

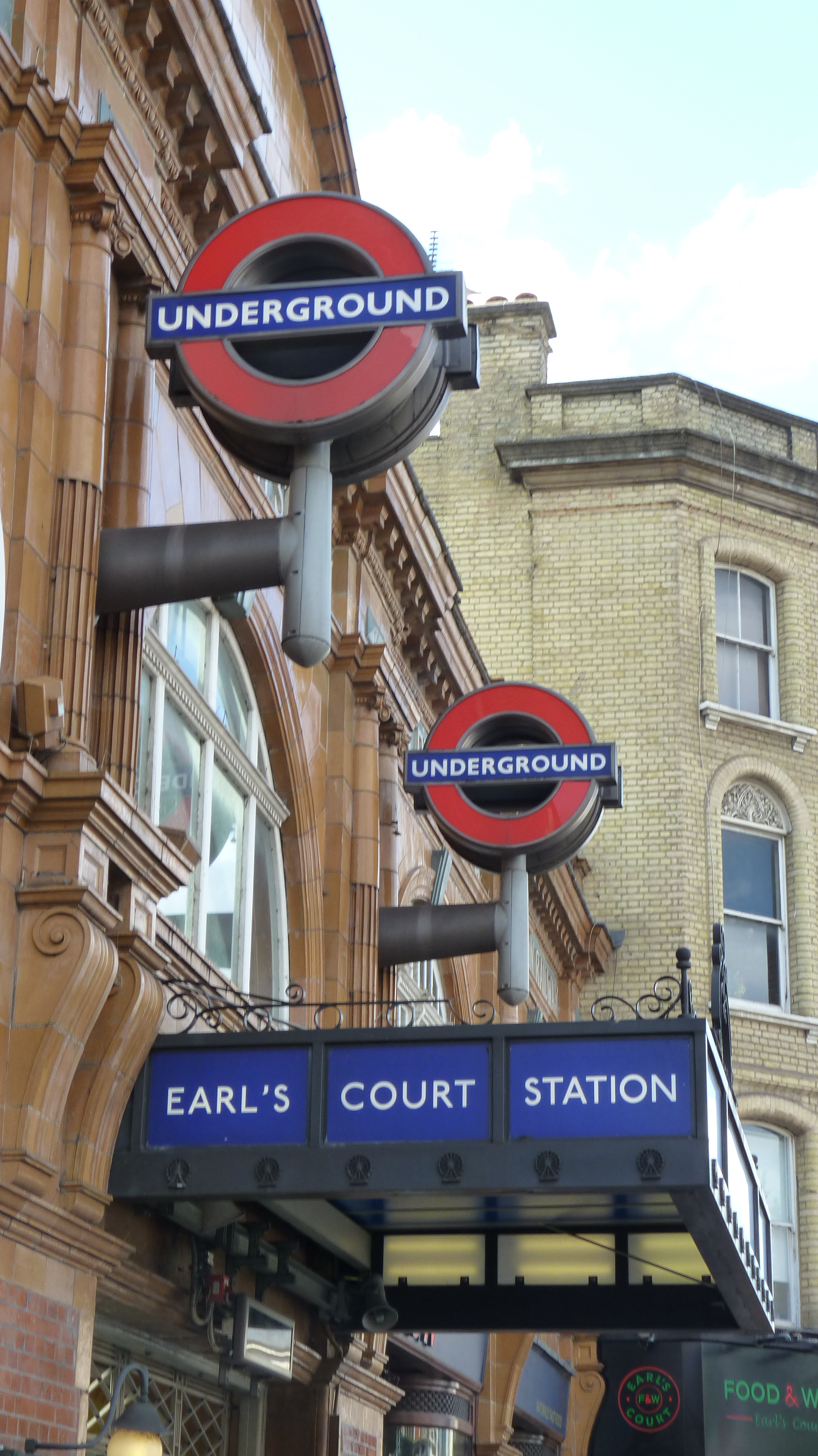

Earl's Court is a Grade II listed London Underground station in Earl's Court, London, on the District and Piccadilly lines. It is an important interchange for both lines and is situated in both London fare zone 1 and 2. The station has an eastern entrance on Earl's Court Road and a western entrance on Warwick Road (both part of A3220). Another former entrance allowed passengers to enter the station from the other side of Warwick Road, via a ticket hall and subway leading to a concourse beneath the District line platforms. Earl's Court is a step-free tube station; the Earls Court Road entrance provides lift access between street and platform levels.

The station was opened by the District Railway in 1871, two years after the line was built, and had become a hub to five different local routes by 1874. It was damaged by fire the following year, and a new station was constructed on the other side of Earl's Court Road, opening in 1878. A connection to the Great Northern, Piccadilly and Brompton Railway (now the Piccadilly Line) opened in 1906. Earl's Court was the first tube station with escalators, which were added in 1911. Major redevelopment and rebuilding work occurred in 1915, 1936–37 and 2005.

== Location ==
Earl's Court has two entrances, which are situated on A3220 Earls Court Road and Warwick Road. The station is within a moderate commercial area, with a few residential and accommodation areas nearby, such as Nevern Square and Philbeach Gardens. It is the nearest stop to Bupa Cromwell Hospital and a Tesco, and formerly next to the now demolished Earl's Court Exhibition Centre. The station sits in the Earl's Court Village and Earl's Court Gardens area.

The station name has been spelt with an apostrophe on the tube map since 1951. Prior to this, the use of punctuation on tube maps was intermittent. The name of the station and the local area has always been shown with an apostrophe on Ordnance Survey maps, but not on the Geographers' A–Z Street Atlas.

== History ==
=== District line ===
On 12 April 1869, the District Railway (DR, now the District line) opened tracks through Earl's Court as part of a south-westward extension from its station at Gloucester Road to West Brompton where the DR opened an interchange with the West London Extension Joint Railway (WLEJR, now the West London Line). At its opening, the extension had no intermediate station.

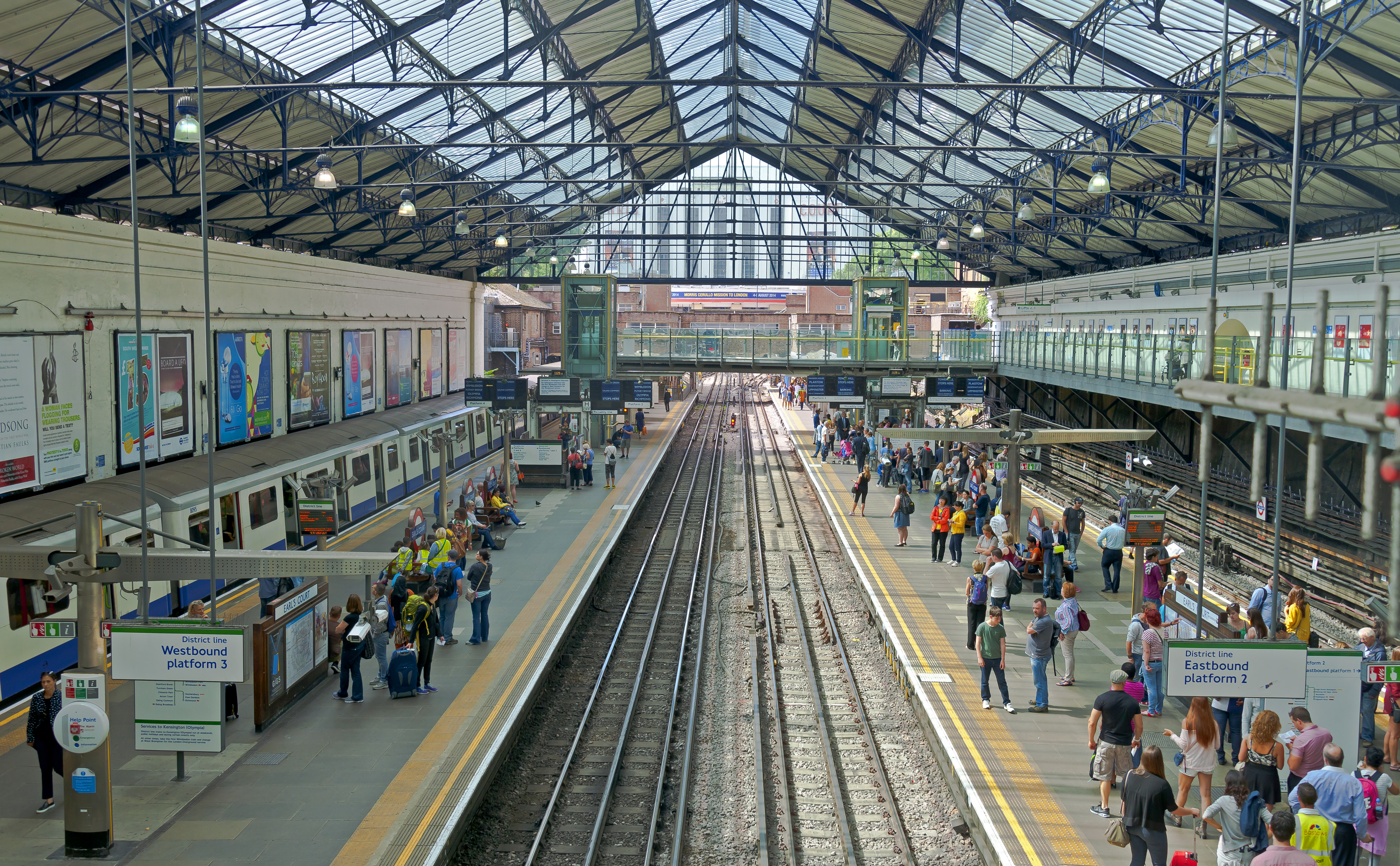
Overhead view of the District line platforms at Earl's Court

On 3 July 1871, the DR opened a northward link from the West Brompton branch which connected to the Inner Circle (now the Circle line) south of High Street Kensington. Local residents near Earl's Court lodged a petition against the DR building the station, which opened on 30 October. The original station was a simple wooden booking office.

On 1 February 1872, the DR opened a northbound branch west of Earl's Court station to the WLEJR to which it connected at Addison Road (now Kensington Olympia). From that date the Outer Circle service began running over the DR's tracks. The service was run by the North London Railway (NLR) from its terminus at Broad Street (now demolished) in the City of London via the North London Line to Willesden Junction, then the West London Line to Addison Road and the DR to Mansion House — at that time the eastern terminus of the DR.

From 1 August 1872, the Middle Circle service also began operations through Earl's Court; it ran from Moorgate along the Metropolitan Railway (MR) tracks on the north side of the Inner Circle to Paddington, then over the Hammersmith & City Railway (H&CR) track to Latimer Road, then, via a now demolished link, to the West London Line to Addison Road and the DR to Mansion House. The service was operated jointly by the H&CR and the DR.

On 9 September 1874, another extension was opened which took the DR west from Earl's Court to West Kensington and Hammersmith. Trains from Earl's Court could then travel via five different routes, and the station's efficient operation was central to the DR's success. The station was damaged by fire on 30 November 1875 and a more substantial replacement was built to the west of Earl's Court Road, opening on 1 February 1878. The original station site was redeveloped into shops and a post office around 1905.

On 5 May 1878, The Midland Railway began running a circuitous service known as the Super Outer Circle from St Pancras to Earl's Court via Cricklewood and South Acton. It operated over a now disused connection between the NLR and the London and South Western Railway's branch to Richmond (now part of the District line). The service was not a success and was ended on 30 September 1880.

By the start of the 20th century competition from buses and the new electric trams was eroding passenger numbers; to make itself more competitive, the DR began to plan the electrification of its services. An experimental service was operated for six months in 1900 when electric trains were tested over the section of track between Earl's Court and High Street Kensington. Following protracted negotiations with the MR over the method of electrification to be used, the first electrified section of the DR was opened in 1903. Electric services through Earl's Court began on 1 July 1905.

=== Piccadilly line ===
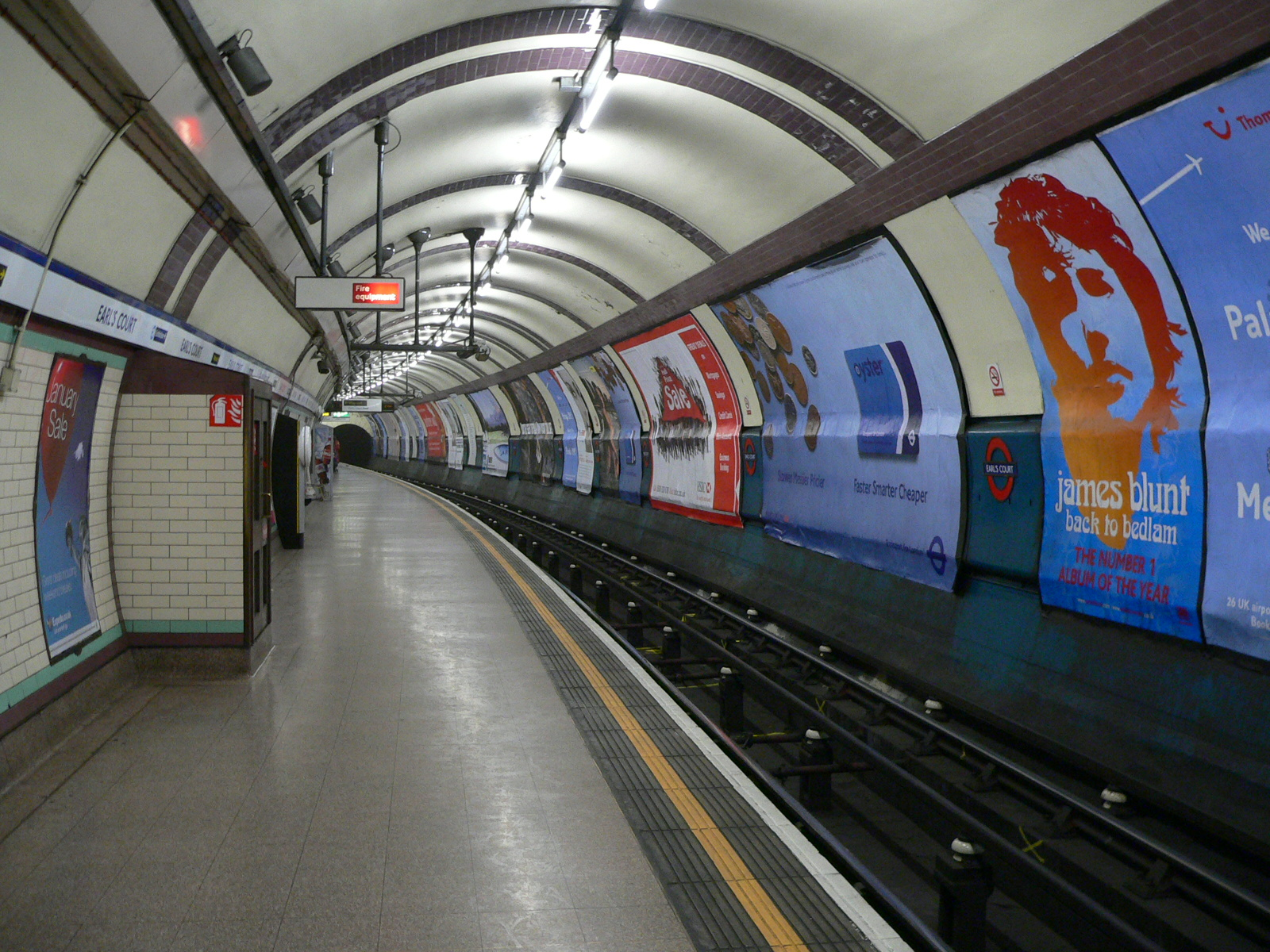
The eastbound Piccadilly line platform

On 30 June 1900, the Middle Circle service was withdrawn east of Earl's Court, which was the terminus of the service until 31 January 1905, when the service was cut back again to terminate at Addison Road. On 15 December 1906, the Great Northern, Piccadilly and Brompton Railway (GNP&BR, now the Piccadilly line) opened between Hammersmith and Finsbury Park, serving Earl's Court from platforms in deep tube tunnels constructed beneath the surface station. Unlike at Gloucester Road and South Kensington, other stations served by both the District and Piccadilly lines, a new building to house the lifts to the deep level platforms was not required. Instead space was provided within the existing station, and the line ran in a deep tunnel beneath the District platforms.

On 1 January 1909, Earl's Court became the terminus of the Outer Circle service when it stopped running east from there to Mansion House. By then, the service was operated by the London and North Western Railway (LNWR, successor to the NLR).

=== Later developments ===
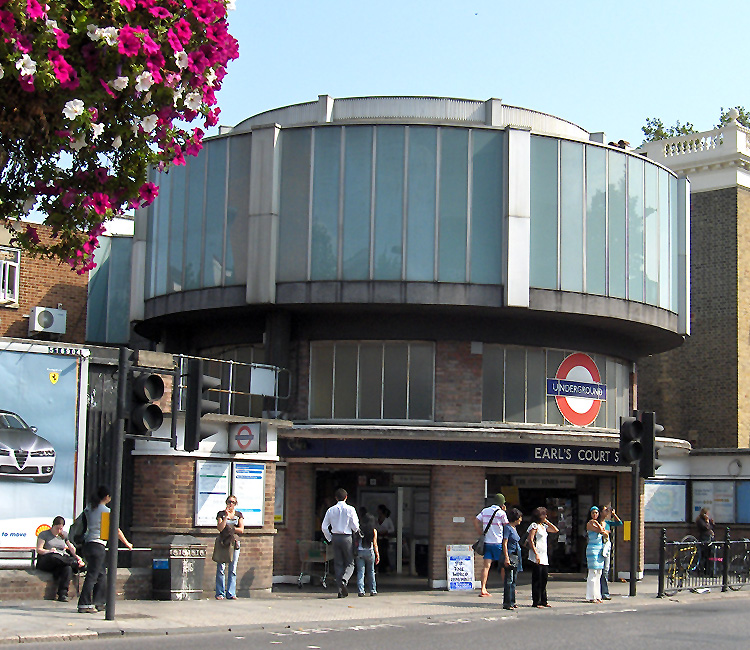
Warwick Road entrance, with rotunda above

On 4 October 1911, the first escalators on the Underground opened at Earl's Court to supplement the lift access. They were promoted as "made entirely of fireproof material"; unlike the lifts, one could smoke on them. These operated from the GNP&BR platforms up to new passageways beneath the sub-surface District platforms. "Bumper" Harris, a one-legged engineer, rode the escalators on the first day of operation to reassure passengers of their safety. In 1936, the escalators were replaced in a contemporary style featuring cleated steps and combs, which had become standard elsewhere on the Underground network. They remain in use into the 21st century, though the wooden cladding has been removed because of fire regulations.

A new station building on Earls Court Road opened in 1915. It was designed by District line architect Harry Ford and constructed from red brick. The Warwick Road entrance was rebuilt between 1936 and 1937 in the modern brick and glass style then employed by London Underground, though it retained the original facade from the opening of the Piccadilly line in 1905/6.

During World War II, bomb damage to the West London Line caused the closure of the line, and the Willesden to Earl's Court shuttle last ran on 2 October 1940. The section to Kensington (Olympia) was reopened on 19 December 1946 but ran only when exhibitions were open at Olympia. The part of the station between the District and Piccadilly Lines was converted into a munitions factory used to make torpedo periscopes.

A glass rotunda was added on top of the Warwick Road entrance in 1970. In 1984, the station was 'Grade II' listed as being of architectural and historical interest. The listing noted the 1878 train shed and the improvements in 1906 and 1937.

Between 1986 and 2011, the Kensington (Olympia) service was operated full-time throughout the week, whether or not an exhibition was open. From December 2011 onwards, it reverted to operating only during exhibitions.

The station underwent major refurbishment works in 2005. Additional lifts for the mobility impaired were added from the District line platforms. They initially suffered from operational issues, leading to a review of the equipment by Transport for London. In December 2006, work started on repairing the roof as part of a £10 billion restoration programme. At the 2009 National Railway Heritage Awards the reconstruction of the station's train shed roof gained a certificate of merit for the quality of the work carried out.

In 2019, a report showed that Earl's Court was one of the most polluted stations in London. The levels of nitrogen dioxide in the station complex approached 129.5 μg/m^{3} (5.66×10^{−5} gr/cu ft), over three times the recommended objective limit of 40 μg/m^{3} (1.7×10^{−5} gr/cu ft). It was concluded that the station was more polluted than Strand in the City of Westminster.

== Services ==
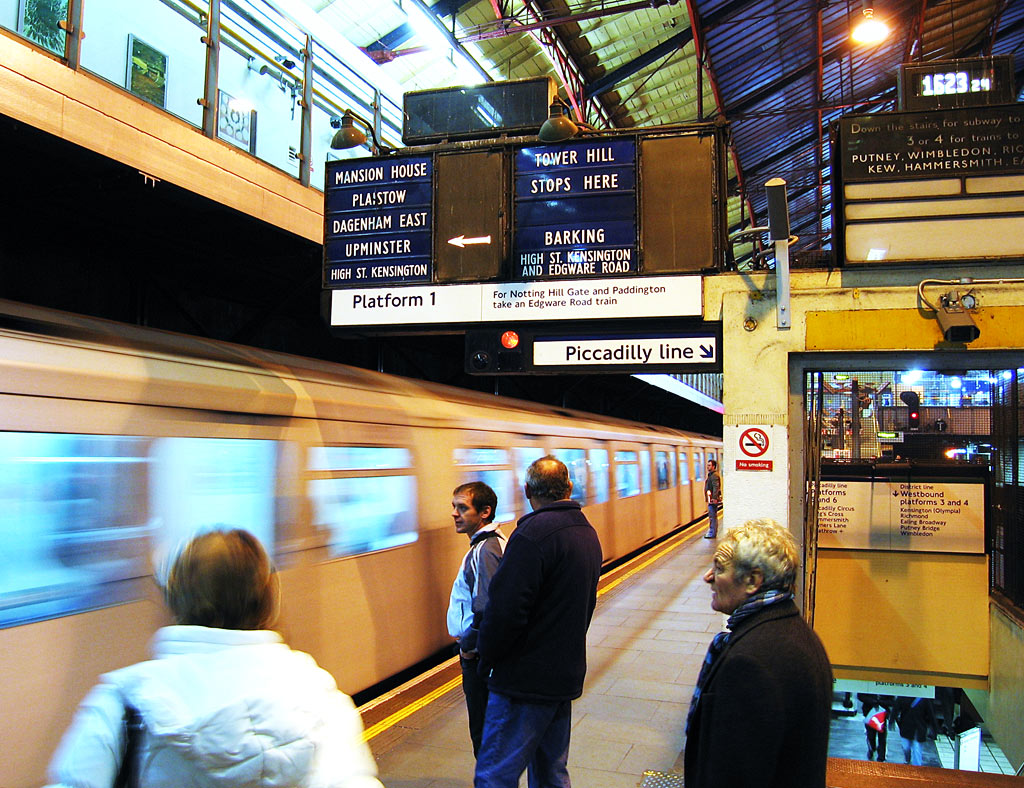
Next-train indicators on the District line platforms

Earl's Court is a hub for several routes on the District and Piccadilly lines. It is in both London fare zone 1 and 2. The station concourse is split over two levels. The District line is on the upper section 4.8 metres (16 ft) below ground and covers platforms 1–4, with two island platforms in between the pairs of lines. The Piccadilly line covers the lower platforms 5–6, 19.8 metres (65 ft) below ground. The connecting escalators are by the Warwick Road entrance, while the lift is towards the centre. Platforms 1 and 2 serve the District line eastbound to Edgware Road and Upminster, while platforms 3 and 4 runs westbound to Wimbledon, Richmond and Ealing Broadway along with a part-time service to Kensington (Olympia). Platforms 5 serves the Piccadilly line eastbound to Cockfosters, and platform 6 serves the line westbound to Uxbridge and Heathrow Airport.

Preceding station	London Underground	Following station
West Kensington towards Ealing Broadway or Richmond	District line No correspondence between sides	Gloucester Road towards Upminster
West Brompton towards Wimbledon	District line No correspondence between sides	High Street Kensington towards Edgware Road
Kensington (Olympia) Terminus	District line No correspondence between sides	High Street Kensington Terminus
Barons Court towards Uxbridge, Rayners Lane or Heathrow Airport (Terminal 4 or Terminal 5)	Piccadilly line	Gloucester Road towards Cockfosters or Arnos Grove
Former service
West Kensington towards St Pancras	Midland Railway (1878–1880)	Terminus

The station has a dedicated regulating room which has served as the principal point for signalling on the Piccadilly and District lines since the 1960s. Most of the junctions and reversing points along the network are controlled automatically. On each platform is an old-fashioned "next train" indicator board which had various routes shown, of which one is usually highlighted by an arrow to indicate that this is the route of the next train. In March 2022 these were temporarily disabled while signalling was being upgraded to CBTC signalling, as part of the 4LM improvement works to the subsurface lines, however they were brought back into service in June of the same year, after being updated, in order to work with the upgraded signalling systems. These have not been replaced by modern electronic equivalents for heritage reasons, as they are part of the station's Grade II listing.

== Connections ==
London Buses day and night routes serve the station.

== See also ==
- Lillie Bridge Depot
