= Kensington (Olympia) station =

Rail interchange station in London, England

Kensington (Olympia)
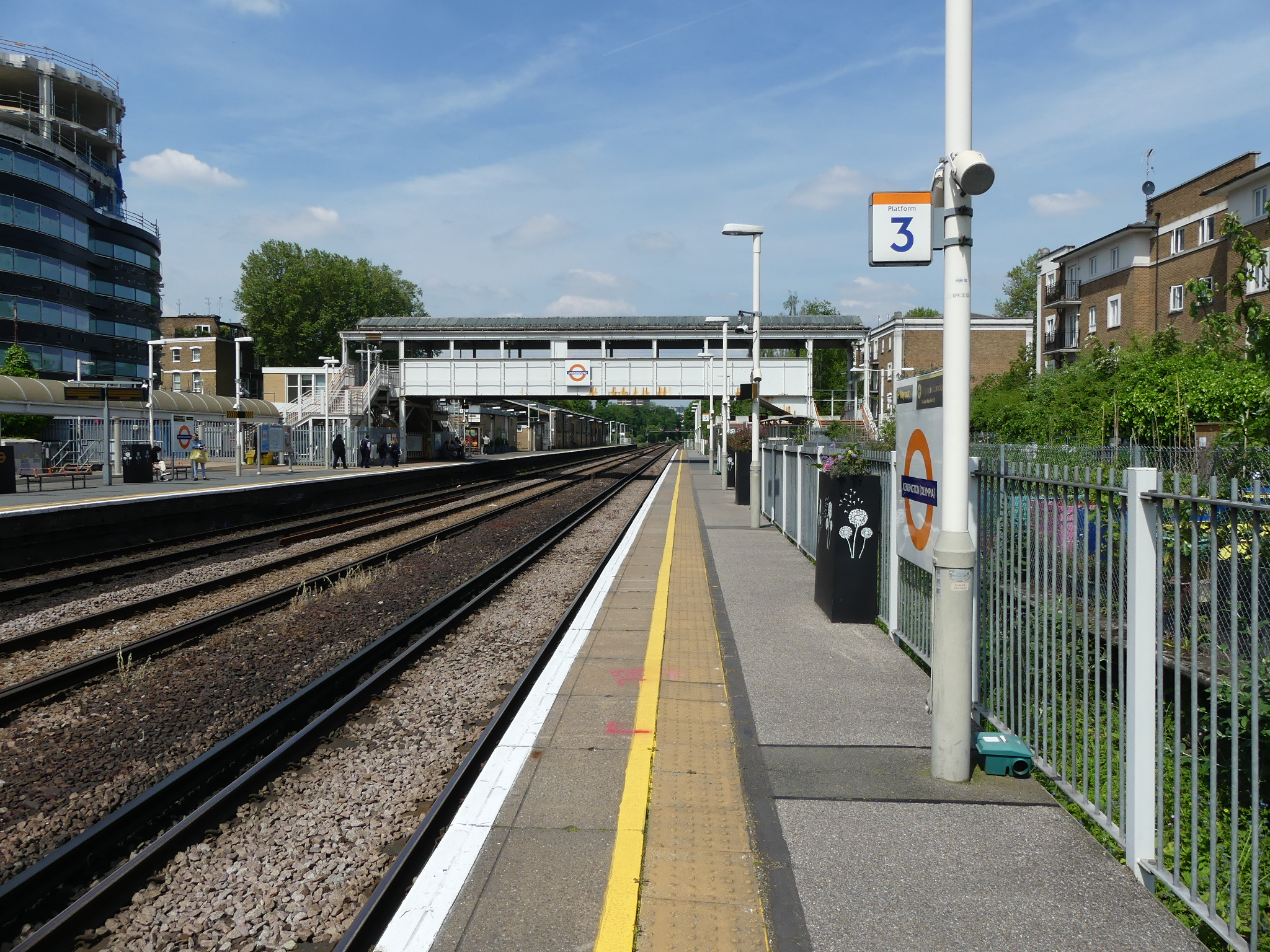
- View from Platform 3 as seen in 2024
- Interactive map of Kensington (Olympia)

General information
- Location: Olympia
- Local authority: Royal Borough of Kensington and Chelsea
- Managed by: London Overground
- Station code: KPA
- DfT category: C2
- Number of platforms: 3 (2 NR/LO, 1 LU)
- Tracks: 4
- Accessible: Yes
- Fare zone: 2

London Underground annual entry and exit
- 2020: ▼0.04 million
- 2021: ▼0.03 million
- 2022: ▲2.10 million
- 2023: ▲2.30 million
- 2024: ▼0.00 million

National Rail annual entry and exit
- 2020–21: ▼0.739 million
- Interchange: ▼8,100
- 2021–22: ▲1.743 million
- Interchange: ▲11,729
- 2022–23: ▲2.282 million
- Interchange: ▼3,443
- 2023–24: ▲2.685 million
- Interchange: ▲3,558
- 2024–25: ▲2.832 million
- Interchange: ▲14,596

Railway companies
- Original company: West London Railway
- Pre-grouping: West London Railway
- Post-grouping: West London Railway

Key dates
- 27 May 1844: first station opened
- 1 Dec 1844: first station closed
- 2 June 1862: second (present) station opened
- 1940: station closed
- 1946: station reopened

Other information
- External links: [ TfL station info page]; Departures; Facilities
- Coordinates: 51.4986°N 0.2108°W

Kensington (Olympia) is an interchange station between the Mildmay line of the London Overground and National Rail services operated by Southern, located in Kensington, West London. Limited services on the District line of the London Underground also operate to here.

The station is located in London fare zone 2. On the London Underground, it is the terminus of a short District line branch from Earl's Court, originally built as part of the Middle Circle. On the main-line railway it is on the West London line from Clapham Junction to Willesden Junction, by which trains bypass inner London. The station's name is drawn from its location in Kensington and the adjacent Olympia exhibition centre in West Kensington.

The station was originally opened in 1844 by the West London Railway but closed shortly afterwards. It reopened in 1862 and began catering for Great Western services the following year. In 1872 it became part of the Middle Circle train route that bypassed central London. The station was bombed during World War II and subsequently closed. It reopened in 1946 but the limited service to Clapham Junction was recommended for withdrawal in the 1960s Beeching Report. The main-line station was revitalised later in the decade as a terminus for national Motorail, and upgraded again in 1986 to serve a wider range of InterCity destinations. The station's Underground connection after World War II was limited to a shuttle service to and from Earl's Court.

== Name and location ==
View of Olympia from the station

In 1863, with the opening of the West London Extension Railway, a station named Kensington was opened 3/8 mile (600 m) north of the junction with the West London Railway, but when several underground lines opened stations at High Street Kensington and West Kensington, the station name was changed to Addison Road to avoid any confusion.

The station appears as Kensington Olympia on the National Rail website and on some of its maps and timetables. On London Underground and London Overground maps, station signage and the London Rail & Tube Services map, it is labelled Kensington (Olympia). (Note: The variant with brackets is also used in the London Railway Atlas, published by Ian Allan Publishing in 2009.) On the automated announcements and the dot matrix indicators on District line trains, the station is shown as simply Olympia.

The station is located alongside the namesake Olympia exhibition centre. The boundary between the Royal Borough of Kensington and Chelsea and the London Borough of Hammersmith and Fulham here runs parallel to and immediately to the west of the railway line.

The platforms are accessed via Russell Road from the east and Olympia Way from the west. A footbridge connects the two roads, and is segregated so it is possible to walk directly from Russell Road to Olympia Way without having to pass through any ticket barriers. Platform 1 serves the part-time District line services towards High Street Kensington via Earl's Court, platform 2 serves Mildmay line Overground trains towards Willesden, and platform 3 runs towards Clapham Junction.

London Buses routes 9, 27, 28, 49, 306, C1; night routes N9, N28 and Green Line Coaches services 701 and 702 call at and pass the station.

== History ==
=== Opening ===
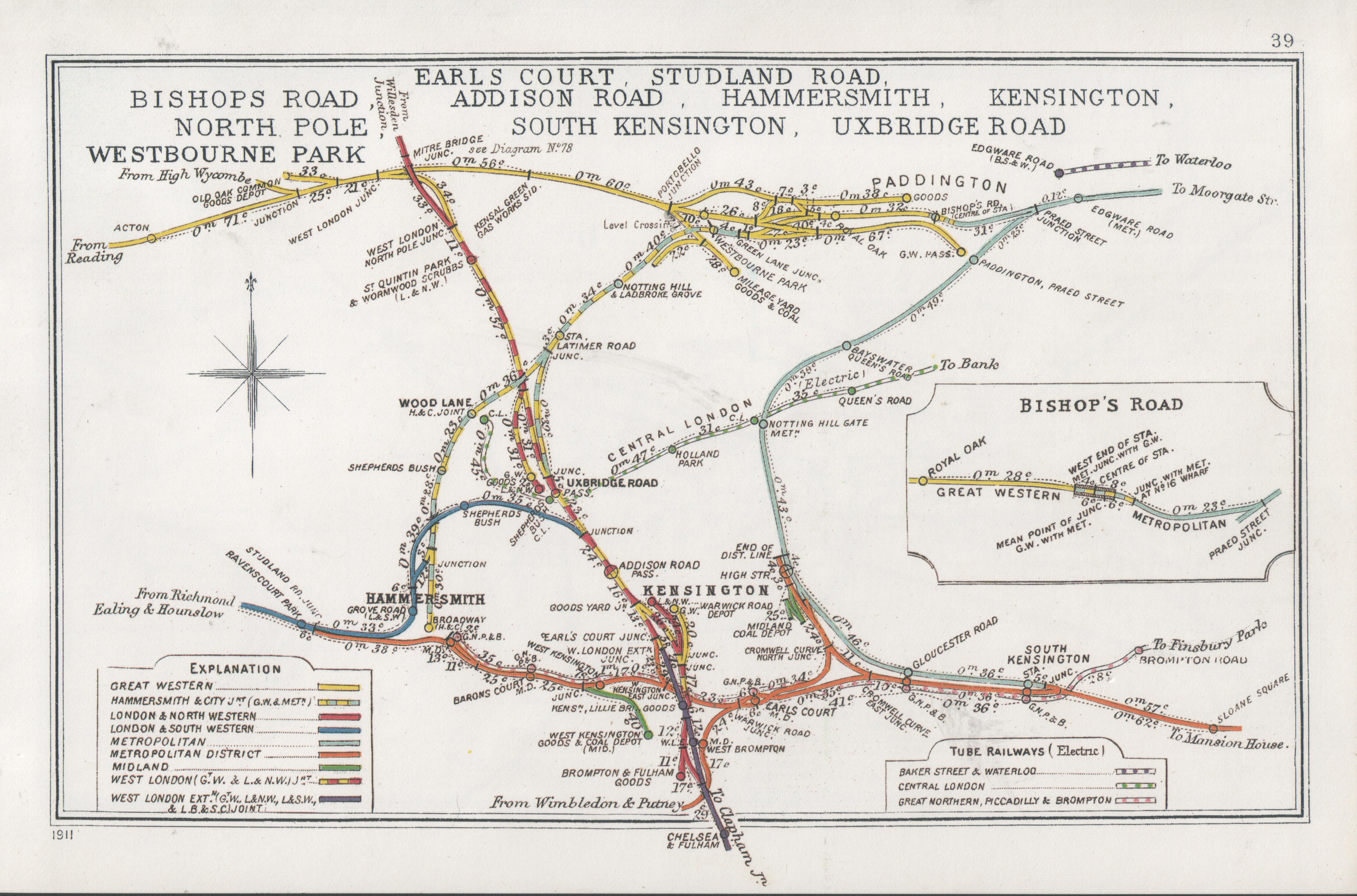
A 1911 Railway Clearing House Junction Diagram showing railways in the vicinity of Kensington Olympia (lower centre, indicated as "Addison Road")

A station called Kensington was opened by the West London Railway as its southern terminus on 27 May 1844, located just south of Hammersmith Road. The line was not popular and it was closed on 1 December that year due to the losses made. A scant and erratic goods service continued. The line was re-opened to passengers on 2 June 1862 as part of the West London Extension Railway with a new station, also called Kensington, to the north of Hammersmith Road, providing services to Willesden and Clapham Junction. Great Western Railway trains started serving the station in 1863, with London & North Western Railway trains arriving in 1872. A link to the Hammersmith & City Railway enabled the station to join the Middle Circle service, which operated via Paddington to the north and South Kensington to the south. In 1868 the station was renamed Kensington Addison Road.

From 1869 the London & South Western Railway operated trains from Richmond to London Waterloo via Addison Road, until their branch via Shepherd's Bush closed in 1916. By 1907 the Middle Circle had been replaced by a link to Hammersmith. The station appears on the first 'London Underground' map in 1908 with Metropolitan and District Railway services.

There was an Express Dairies creamery and milk bottling plant close to the station. It was served by milk trains running from the Great Western Railway at Old Oak Common to a siding adjacent to the station.

=== Decline ===
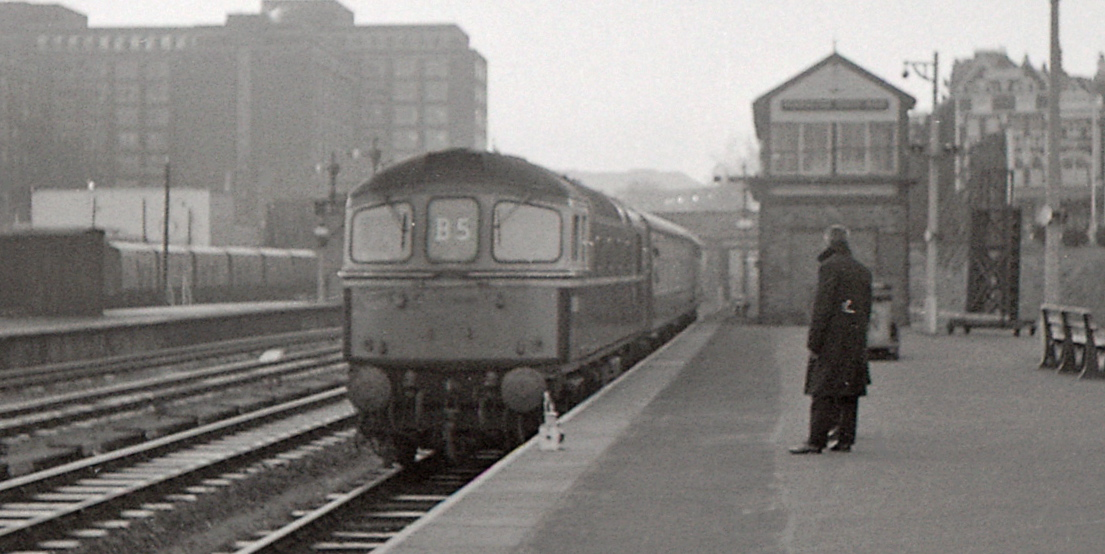
A Post Office workers' train at Kensington (Olympia) in 1968

In 1940, Addison Road and the link to the Metropolitan line at Latimer Road closed along with the other West London Line stations after the line was bombed, and it was not considered cost-effective to rebuild by the London Passenger Transport Board. Due to its ability to access all lines radiating from London, its close location to SHAEF headquarters and its relative quietness compared to the main London termini, it was the preferred embarkation point for US Army General Dwight D. Eisenhower when he visited troops in Wales preparing for the June 1944 Normandy landings.

On 19 December 1946, the station was renamed Kensington (Olympia) and became the northern terminus of a peak-hour shuttle service to Clapham Junction, serving workers at the Post Office Savings Bank (later National Savings Bank) in nearby Blythe Road. From 1955 to 1986, apart from Motorail services, this was the only British Rail service regularly stopping at the station. It was known as the "Kenny Belle" and was unadvertised, reportedly because the Post Office Savings Bank was under the Official Secrets Act. There was also a District line shuttle to Earl's Court, as the station had been left without a dedicated Underground connection. The service originally only ran when there was an exhibition at the centre, but a permanent platform opened on 3 March 1958. The station was sometimes used as a terminus during reconstruction and upgrading of mainline London terminal stations.

=== Cold War ===
Kensington (Olympia) was included in 1960s Cold War plans to ensure continuity of government in the event of hostilities. Secret plans entailed use of the station, in the prelude to a nuclear war, to evacuate several thousand civil servants to the Central Government War Headquarters underground bunker (codenamed "Burlington") in Wiltshire. Civil servants tasked with staffing the facility would have been directed to join trains at this station, chosen since the West London Line connected to the Great Western Main Line (and hence Wiltshire) at North Pole Junction, 1 mile 68 chains (2.98 km) to the north. These trains would have connected with buses at Warminster for further transfer to the bunker near Corsham.

=== Motorail ===
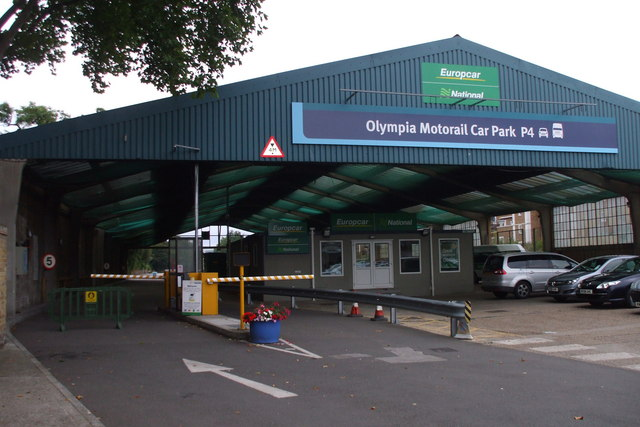
The former Motorail terminal in 2009

In 1966 Kensington (Olympia) became the main London terminus for British Rail Motorail trains, which carried passengers and vehicles across Britain. In the London Midland Region timetable for 1970–71, services are shown to Perth, Stirling, Carlisle, St Austell, Totnes, Newton Abbot and Fishguard (connecting with the ferry for Rosslare). This facility closed in 1981 with operations transferred to Paddington, Euston and King's Cross.

The car park for the service is now used for exhibition vehicles, and by Europcar for car rental, and is called "Olympia Motorail Car Park P4".

=== Revival ===
A former bay platform is now Olympia Garden with 89 vegetable plots.

From 12 May 1986 services at the station were greatly enhanced. The London Underground shuttle service started to run to a regular daily schedule, and inter-regional services from the Midlands and northern England stopped at Kensington (Olympia). Southern Region destinations included Brighton and Dover Western Docks. As part of this the footbridge was painted in InterCity colours. These trains were operated by the InterCity division of British Rail and later, after privatisation, by Virgin CrossCountry and CrossCountry. Destinations included Birmingham New Street, Liverpool Lime Street, Manchester Piccadilly, Glasgow Central and Edinburgh Waverley. The services were withdrawn in October 2008, by which time only two daily Brighton–Manchester journeys were operated. The station was part of the London Station Group, accepting "London Terminals" tickets, until it was delisted in May 1994. The same year, a full passenger service between Willesden Junction and Clapham Junction was reinstated after a gap of 54 years.

There were two bay platforms on the south-eastern side, mainly used by services to/from Clapham Junction. These platforms were removed in 1983 and the track was lifted; the space was used for an additional car park for the exhibition centre. One of the former platforms is now Olympia Garden, a community garden with 89 vegetable plots.

Before the Channel Tunnel Rail Link was proposed in 1996, Kensington (Olympia) was planned to be expanded to accommodate a car terminal for international services including Regional Eurostar. The line would have run via the West London and South Eastern Main Lines to Folkestone Central before entering the tunnel. Before Eurostar transferred in November 2007 to St Pancras International, Eurostar trains passed through the station between Waterloo International station and North Pole depot, and the station was a backup terminus for the services in case Waterloo International became unusable; immigration facilities were maintained there.

In June 2011, Transport for London (TfL) announced that the District line shuttle between Kensington (Olympia) and Earl's Court would close on weekdays at the end of the year. The Royal Borough of Kensington and Chelsea unsuccessfully protested against the closure, and general weekday services ceased in December 2011. Some special weekday services continue to run on the District line when there is an exhibition on. In 2012 TfL announced plans to introduce ticket gates at the station to combat fare dodgers, which would remove access to the footbridge used by local residents for years. Both the councils within whose boundaries this station falls challenged this loss of an established right of way. The gates were added in September 2013, dividing the bridge into two to maintain pedestrian access on one side without accessing the station platforms.

== Services ==
=== National Rail ===
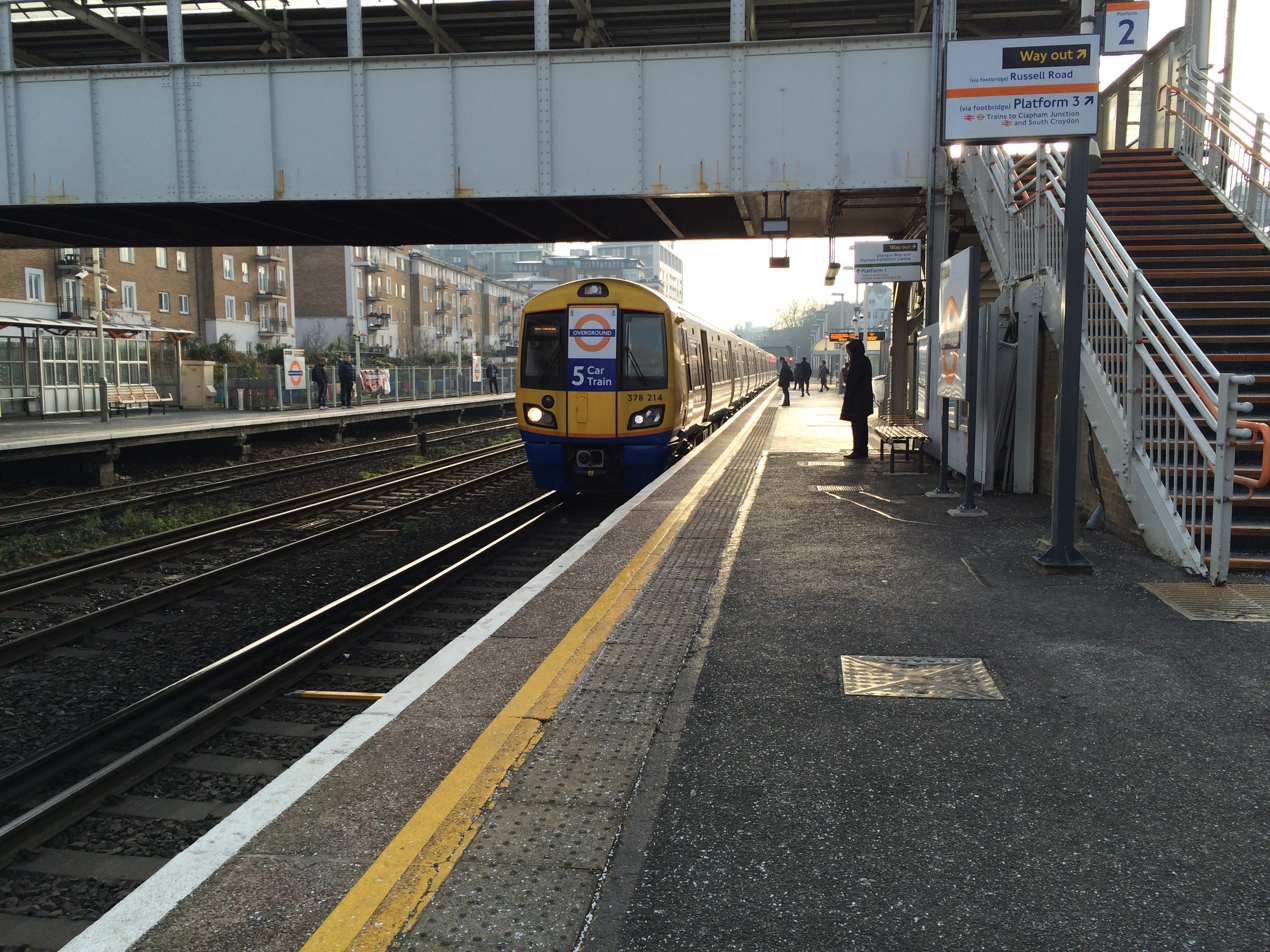
London Overground Class 378 at Kensington Olympia

National Rail services at Kensington Olympia are operated by Southern using Class 377 EMUs. The Mildmay line of the London Overground operates using related Class 378 EMUs.

The typical off-peak service in trains per hour is:

Mildmay Line:

- 4 tph to Stratford via Willesden Junction
- 4 tph to Clapham Junction

During the late evenings services run between Clapham Junction and Willesden Junction only.

Southern:

- 1 tph to East Croydon
- 1 tph to Watford Junction

Additional services call at the station during the peak hours.

=== London Underground ===
The District line of the London Underground operates a shuttle service to and from High Street Kensington every 20 minutes on weekends and public holidays or occasionally when an event takes place at the Olympia Exhibition Centre. A very limited weekday service runs to and from the station during the early mornings and late evenings.

| Preceding station | National Rail | Following station |
|---|---|---|
| Shepherd's Bush | Southern West London Line | West Brompton |
| Preceding station | London Overground | Following station |
| Shepherd's Bush towards Stratford | Mildmay line West London line | West Brompton towards Clapham Junction |
| Preceding station | London Underground | Following station |
| Terminus | District line Limited Service | Earl's Court towards High Street Kensington |
| | Disused railways | |
| Uxbridge Road Line open, station closed | West London Railway | West Brompton Line and station open |
| Shepherd's Bush Line and station closed | London and South Western Railway West London Line | West Brompton Line and station open |
| | Former services | |
| Preceding station | LUL | Following station |
| Uxbridge Road towards Barking | Metropolitan line | Terminus |
