= Shepherd's Bush station =

Shepherd's Bush station may refer to:

- Shepherd's Bush railway station, open station served by London Overground and Southern
- Shepherd's Bush railway station (1874–1916), closed station that was served by London and South Western Railway
- Shepherd's Bush tube station, open London Underground station served by the Central line
- Shepherd's Bush Market tube station, open London Underground station served by the Circle and Hammersmith & City lines
- Stations around Shepherd's Bush, detailing all stations that have been in the Shepherd's Bush area of London
