= Outer Circle (London) =

Railway service in London, England

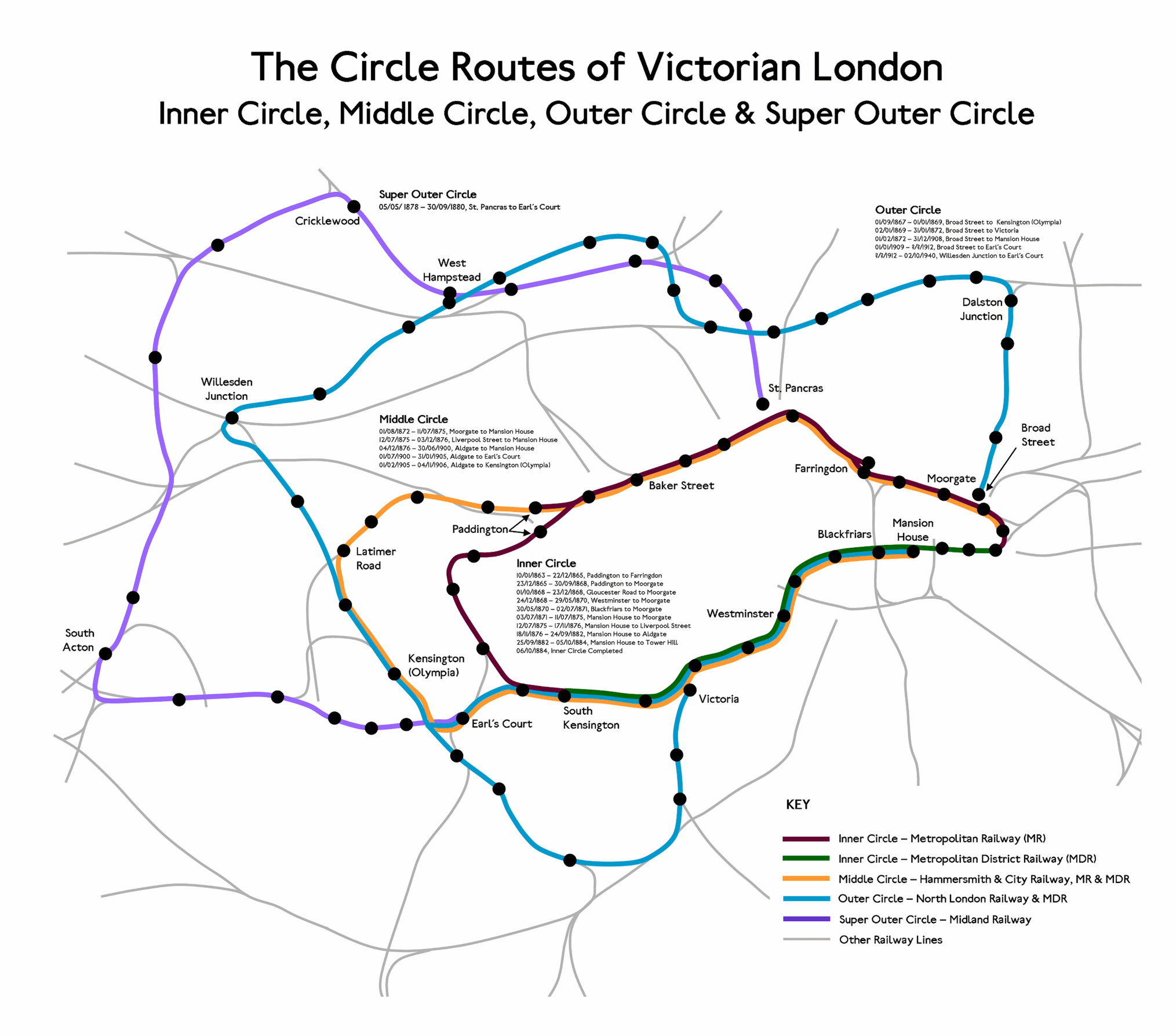
The Outer Circle (coloured blue) and other circular routes

The Outer Circle was a London and North Western Railway service in London that operated from 1872 to 1908. The route was from the District Railway station at Mansion House to Earl's Court, then via the West London Railway to Willesden Junction and then via the North London Railway to Broad Street. Although not a complete circuit, it was one of several 'circle' routes around London that opened at the same time, such as the 'inner circle' that is today's Circle line. Trains would run once every 30 minutes. In 1908 the service was cut back to run from Earl's Court to Broad Street.

The Midland Railway operated a kind of Super Outer Circle from St Pancras to Earl's Court for two years from 1878 to 1880, via the Dudding Hill freight line.

== Outer Circle ==
=== History ===
On 1 February 1872 the London and North Western Railway (L&NWR) began a railway service between Broad Street and the District Railway station at Mansion House via the North London Railway, Willesden Junction, the West London Railway and Earl's Court, replacing a service that had run along much of the same route to London Victoria. This service became known as the 'outer circle' and was worked with L&NWR locomotives and carriages and there was a train every thirty minutes. When the District electrified in 1905, it built electric locomotives to haul the carriages between Earl's Court and Mansion House. The service appears on the 1908 'London Underground' map between Earl's Court and Uxbridge Road as a District Railway service.

The service ceased to run east of Earl's Court from 1 January 1909. The L&NWR electrified the West London Railway and an electric service between Willesden Junction and Earl's Court on started 1 May 1914. This was initially with electric multiple units provided by the District Railway until 24 November 1914 when LNWR electric units took over. Passenger services on the West London Railway ended on 19 October 1940 following Second World War bomb damage to the line.

Uxbridge Road station closed with the line in 1940 and Shepherd's Bush opened on the same site in 2008. The line is currently served by the District line between Mansion House and Kensington (Olympia) and then the London Overground to Haggerston.

=== List of stations ===
The following stations, listed anti-clockwise, were served by the Outer Circle:

Station	Closed	Notes
Broad Street	1986	now demolished
Shoreditch	1940	
Haggerston	1940	reopened 2010 as part of the London Overground
Dalston Junction	1986	reopened 2010 as part of the London Overground
Mildmay Park	1934	
Canonbury		
Highbury		opened 1872; now Highbury & Islington
Barnsbury		now Caledonian Road & Barnsbury
Maiden Lane	1916	
Camden Town		opened 1870; now Camden Road
Kentish Town		now Kentish Town West
Gospel Oak		
Hampstead Heath		
Finchley Road		now Finchley Road & Frognal
West End Lane		opened 1888; now West Hampstead
Brondesbury		
Brondesbury Park		opened 1904
Kensal Green & Harlesden		opened 1873; now Kensal Rise
Willesden Junction		
Wormwood Scrubs	1940	renamed St. Quintin Park
Uxbridge Road	1940	Shepherd's Bush station opened on the same site in 2008
Addison Road		now Kensington (Olympia)
Earl's Court		
Brompton (Gloucester Road)	service withdrawn 31 December 1908	now Gloucester Road
South Kensington	service withdrawn 31 December 1908	
Sloane Square	service withdrawn 31 December 1908	
Victoria	service withdrawn 31 December 1908	
St James's Park	service withdrawn 31 December 1908	
Westminster Bridge	service withdrawn 31 December 1908	now Westminster
Charing Cross	service withdrawn 31 December 1908	now Embankment
Temple	service withdrawn 31 December 1908	
Blackfriars	service withdrawn 31 December 1908	
Mansion House	service withdrawn 31 December 1908	

== Super Outer Circle ==
The Midland Railway operated a kind of Super Outer Circle from 1878 to 1880. In 1876 the Midland had negotiated running rights over the Metropolitan District Railway from the London & South Western Railway at Hammersmith to South Kensington. The Midland's main interest was supplying coal to Kensington, and in 1878 it opened coal depots at Kensington High Street and West Kensington. From 1 May 1878 it also ran a passenger service from Earl's Court to St Pancras via Hammersmith, South Acton and the Dudding Hill freight line to Cricklewood. Two trains an hour ran until 30 September 1880. The coal depots closed in the 1960s.

== See also ==
- Middle Circle
- Circle line (London Underground)
