= Stations around Shepherd's Bush =

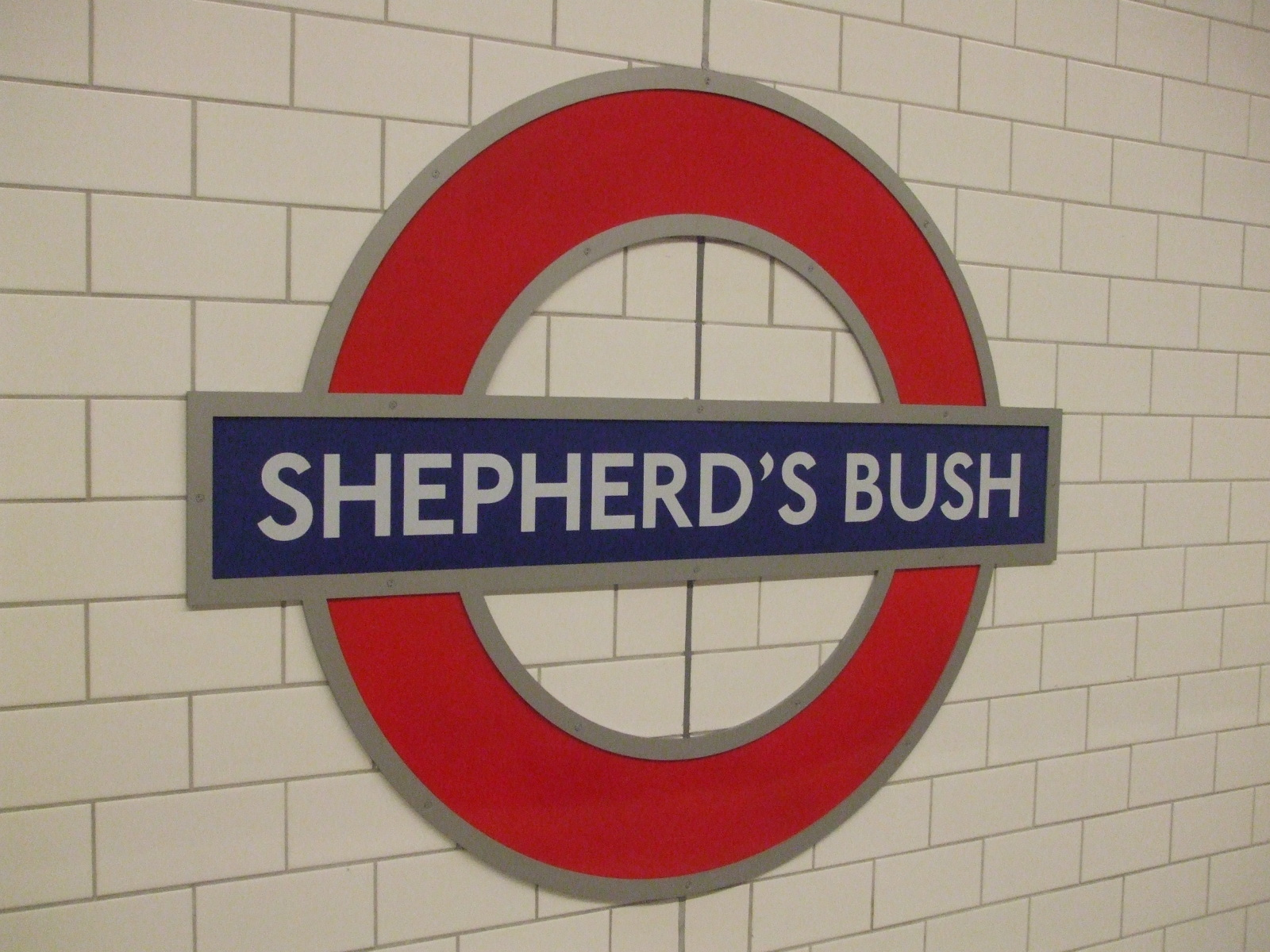
The roundel sign at the present-day Shepherd's Bush tube station

Shepherd's Bush is an area of west London, England, which has been served by a number of London Underground and commuter rail stations over the past 150 years, many of which have had similar names. The names Shepherd's Bush, Wood Lane and White City have each been used by several separate stations around the Shepherd's Bush district, following a number of station renamings and closures.

== Former stations ==
Stations in the Shepherd's Bush area

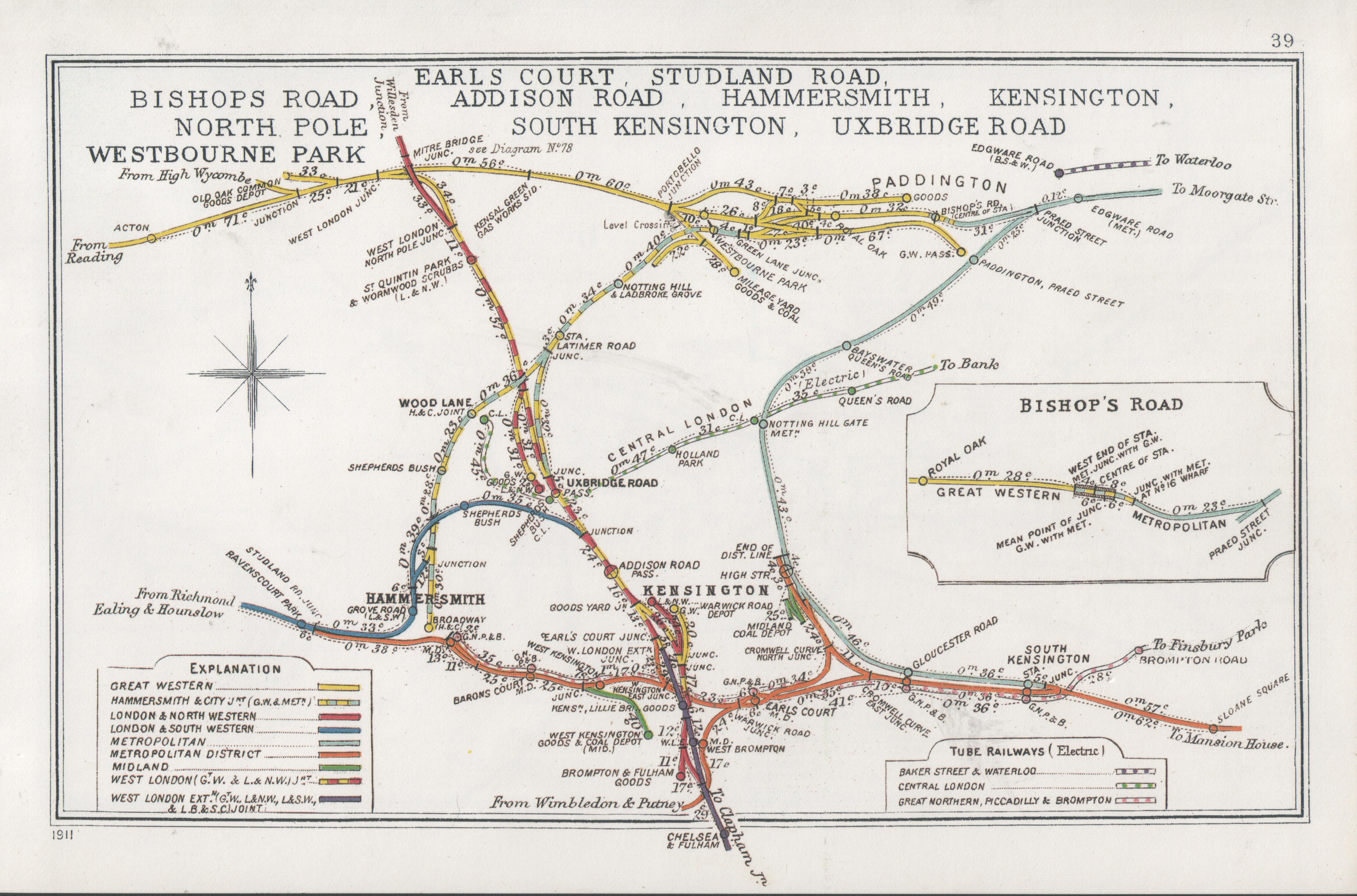
1911 diagram of West London railways

The first Shepherd's Bush station was opened in 1864 by the Metropolitan Railway and Great Western Railway (GWR) on the Hammersmith & City Railway (now part of the Hammersmith & City line), adjacent to Shepherd's Bush Market. It was closed in 1914 and replaced by two new stations: one to the north, also called Shepherd's Bush (now named Shepherd's Bush Market), and one to the south named Goldhawk Road.

A station called Uxbridge Road opened on the West London Railway in 1869. This was on the GWR Middle Circle route that ran from Paddington through Shepherd's Bush to Earl's Court. In about 1905 this route became a branch of the Metropolitan Railway, terminating at Kensington (Addison Road) (now Kensington Olympia). It was also served by London & North Western Railway Outer Circle trains from Broad Street to Mansion House, but by 1914 this became an Earl's Court to Willesden Junction shuttle. Uxbridge Road station was located at the eastern end of Shepherd's Bush Green, close to the start of Holland Park Avenue. It closed in 1940.

The London and South Western Railway (L&SWR) opened its Shepherd's Bush station in 1869 on a loop line that connected the West London Line to the Hammersmith & City line and the L&SWR's tracks to Richmond (now the District line). The station was located on the west side of Shepherd's Bush Road (A219) at the junction with Sulgrave Road. It closed in 1916.

The Central London Railway (CLR) opened its subterranean Shepherd's Bush station in 1900, with its entrance overlooking Shepherd's Bush Green, next to the MR's Uxbridge Road station.

The Franco-British Exhibition and the 1908 Summer Olympics brought about the development of the exhibition and events area known as the White City, and two new Underground stations opened to serve these major international events, both named Wood Lane: the CLR Wood Lane station was a sub-surface station located on the eponymous lane, while the Wood Lane Metropolitan station was situated on a viaduct on its Hammersmith branch nearby. The CLR station closed in 1947 and lay derelict until 2008 when it was demolished to make way for the White City bus station. The Metropolitan station was renamed White City in 1947 and finally closed in 1959.

== Current stations ==
In 2008 the arrangement of Shepherd's Bush stations changed when two new stations were opened, Shepherd's Bush on the West London Line (close to the location of the former Uxbridge Road Metropolitan line station) and Wood Lane station on the Hammersmith & City line (situated near the former Wood Lane/White City Metropolitan line station). Today, two stations bear the name Shepherd's Bush: Shepherd's Bush station, on the Central line, and the West London Line Shepherd's Bush station. The two present-day Shepherd's Bush stations are in close proximity and form an interchange between London Underground and National Rail.

With the addition of another station bearing the name Shepherd's Bush, it was decided to rename the Shepherd's Bush station on the Hammersmith & City line (the old 1914 Metropolitan line Shepherd's Bush station) to Shepherd's Bush Market to avoid confusion with the Overground and Central line stations.

None of the 1908 White City exhibition stations now survive and all the stations in the Wood Lane area are newer constructions: the present Central line White City Underground station (opened in 1947 to replace the former Wood Lane station) and the 2008 Wood Lane Hammersmith & City line station.

== List of stations ==
Station	Line	Opened	Closed	Location
Goldhawk Road	Hammersmith & City line Circle line	1914	open	Located on Goldhawk Road, south-west of Shepherd's Bush Green. Opened when original Metropolitan line Shepherd's Bush station was relocated.
Shepherd's Bush	Metropolitan line	1864	1914	South of Uxbridge Road on the Hammersmith branch (now Hammersmith & City line); moved to present Shepherd's Bush Market site 1914
Shepherd's Bush	L&SWR	1874	1916	Shepherd's Bush Road, north of Sulgrave Road
Shepherd's Bush	Central line	1900	open	Shepherd's Bush Green east end
Shepherd's Bush Market	Hammersmith & City line Circle line	1914	open	Uxbridge Road: originally named Shepherd's Bush (1914–2008) and moved from original 1864 site in 1914
Shepherd's Bush	West London Line	2008	open	Shepherd's Bush Green east end
Uxbridge Road	Metropolitan line	1869	1940	Middle Circle branch (now part of the West London Line)
White City	Central line	1947	open	Wood Lane, opposite BBC Television Centre
Wood Lane	Central line	1908	1947	Wood Lane, site now under White City bus station
Wood Lane (White City)	Metropolitan line	1908	1959	North of present Wood Lane station on the Hammersmith branch (now Hammersmith & City line); originally named Wood Lane (1908–1947)
Wood Lane	Hammersmith & City line Circle line	2008	open	Wood Lane, on viaduct

Present-day stations: visual identifier

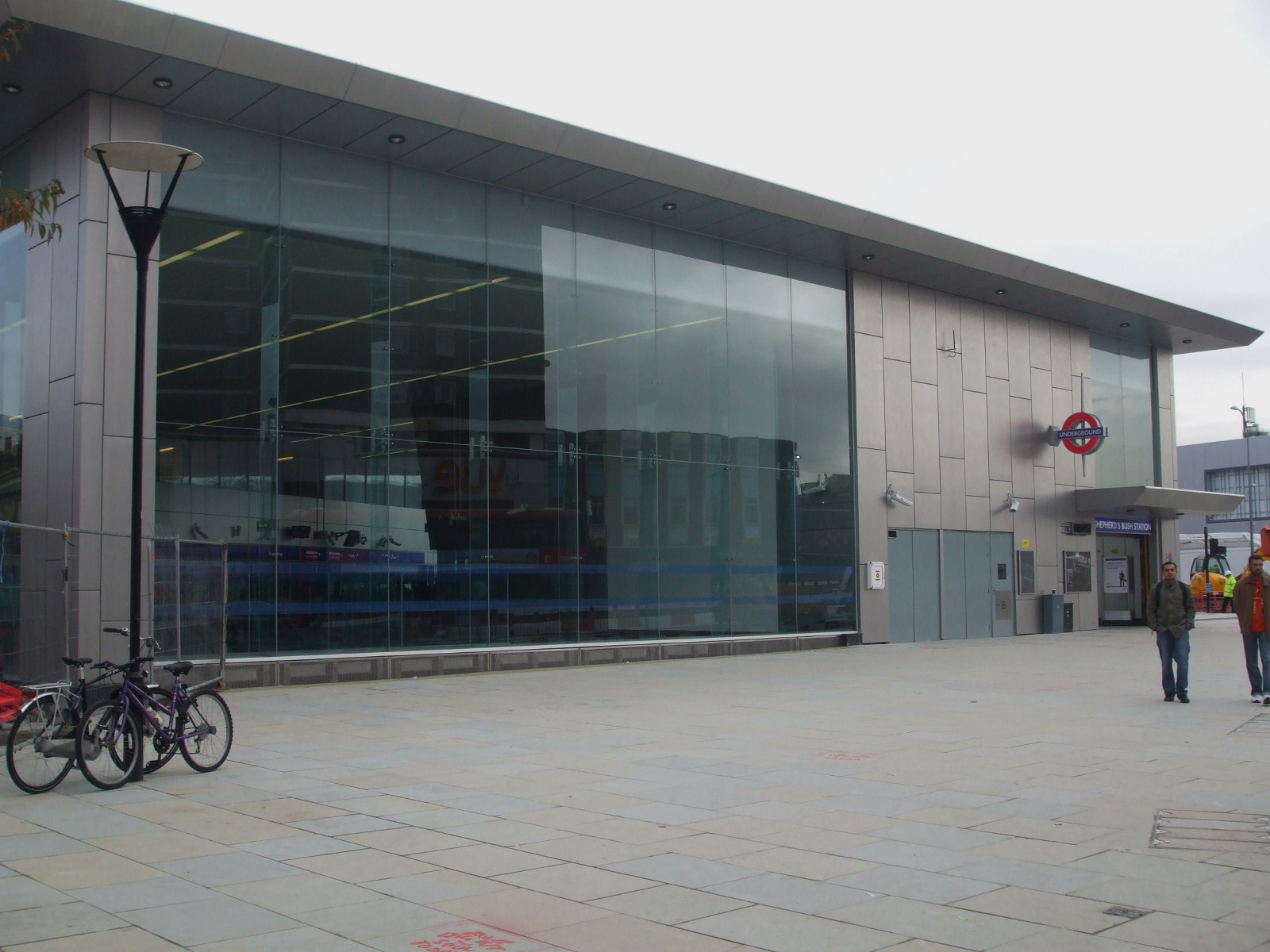
Shepherd's Bush Central line

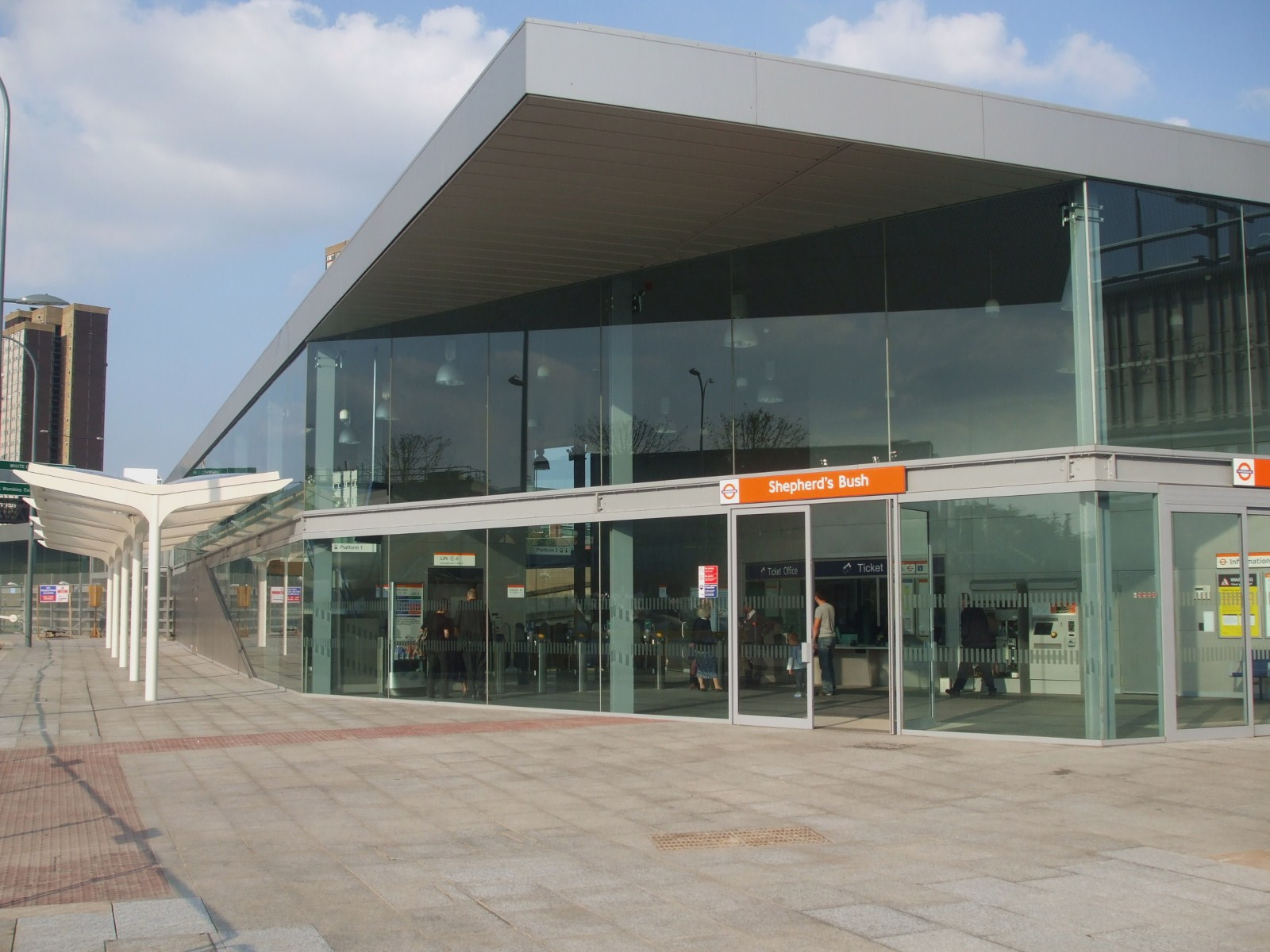
Shepherd's Bush Overground

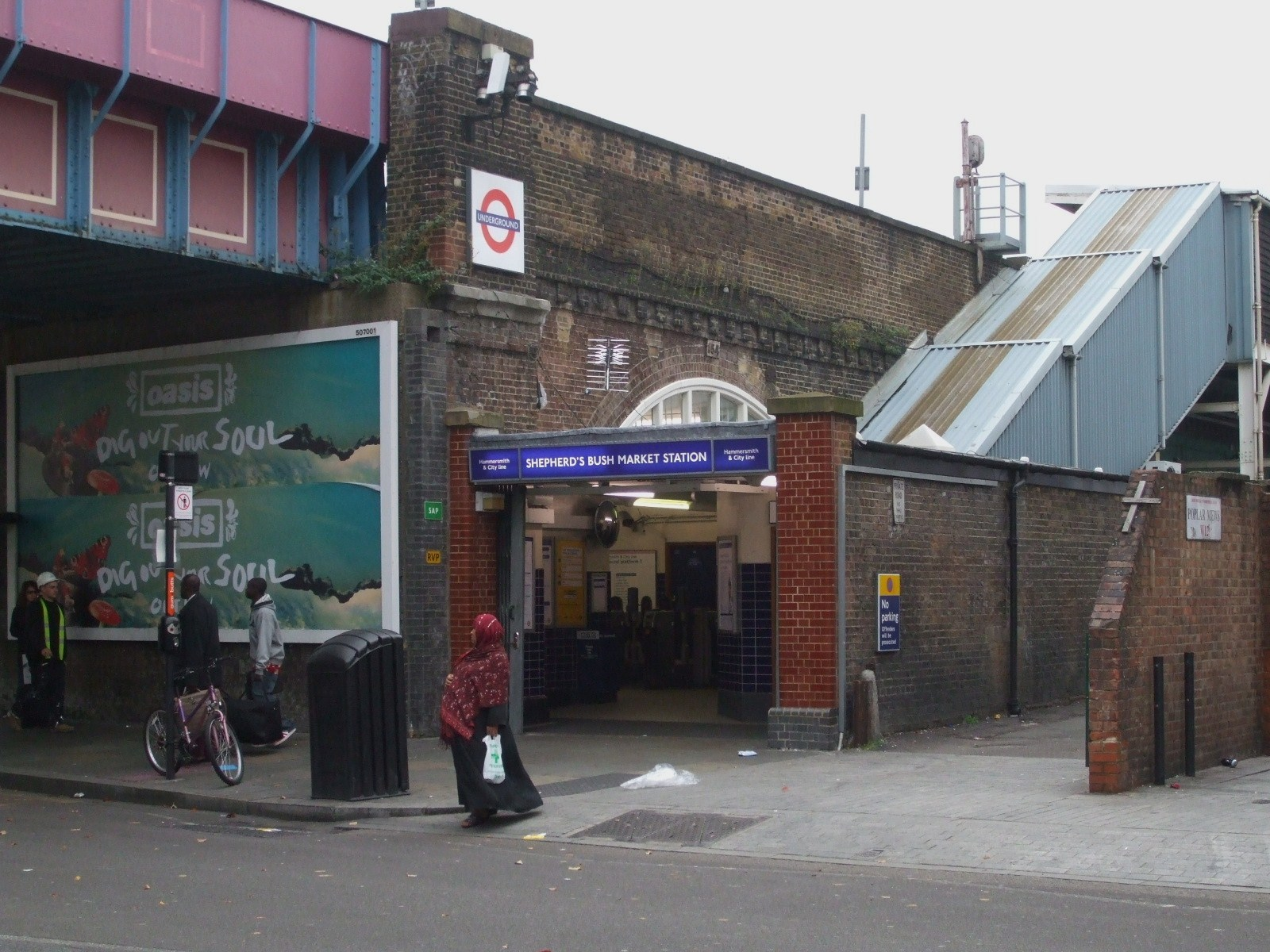
Shepherd's Bush Market Hammersmith & City/Circle

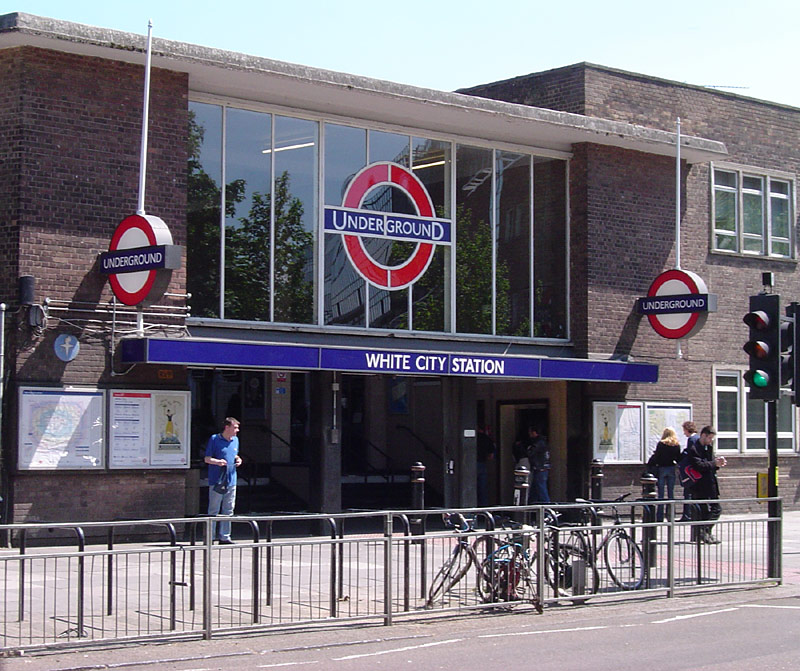
White City Central line

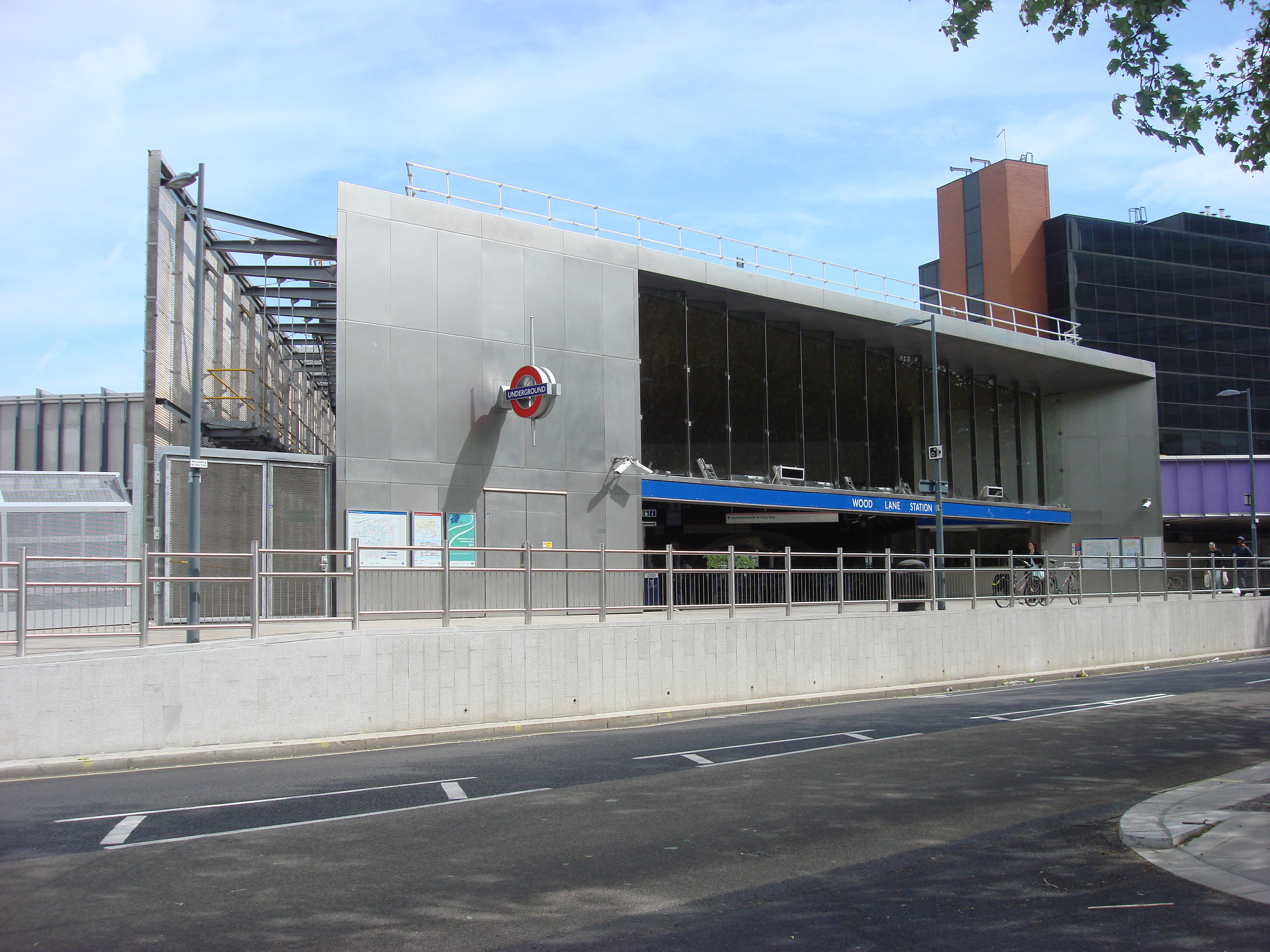
Wood Lane Hammersmith & City/Circle

== See also ==
- List of London Underground stations
