= St James's Park tube station =

London Underground station

St James's Park
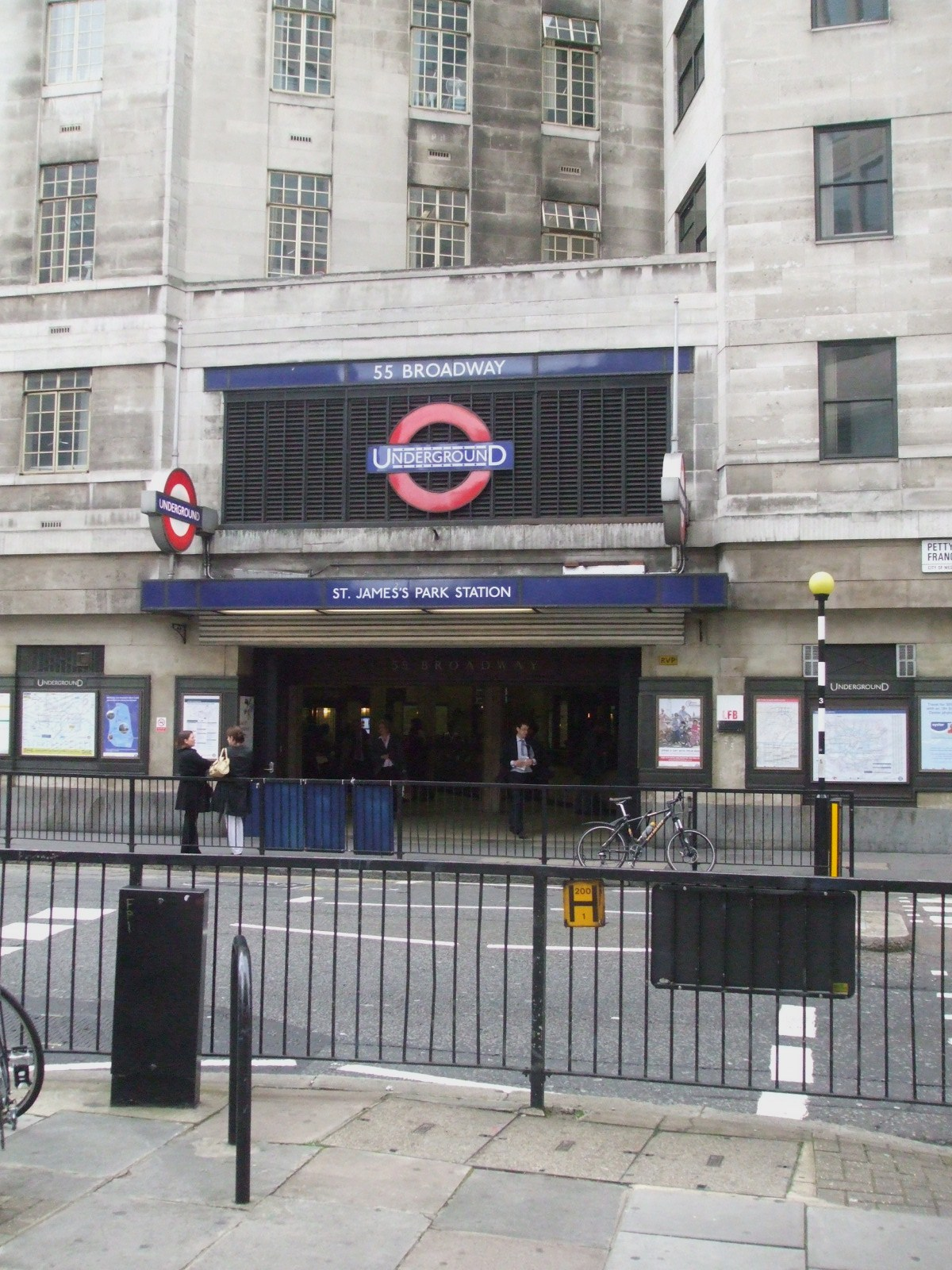
- Entrance from Petty France
- Interactive map of St James's Park

General information
- Location: St James's Park
- Local authority: City of Westminster
- Managed by: London Underground
- Number of platforms: 2
- Fare zone: 1

London Underground annual entry and exit
- 2020: ▼2.92 million
- 2021: ▲3.90 million
- 2022: ▲8.54 million
- 2023: ▲9.53 million
- 2024: ▲10.57 million

Key dates
- 24 December 1868: Opened (DR)
- 1 February 1872: Started "Outer Circle" (NLR)
- 1 August 1872: Started "Middle Circle" (H&CR/DR)
- 30 June 1900: Ended "Middle Circle"
- 31 December 1908: Ended "Outer Circle"
- 1949: Started (Circle line)

Listed status
- Listing grade: I
- Entry number: 1219790
- Added to list: 9 January 1970; 56 years ago

Other information
- Coordinates: 51.4994°N 0.1344°W

St James's Park is a London Underground station. It is located near St James's Park in the City of Westminster, England. The station is on the Circle and District lines, between Victoria and Westminster stations. It is in London fare zone 1.

The station building is incorporated into 55 Broadway, formerly the headquarters of Transport for London, and has entrances both on the junction of 55 Broadway and Petty France and on Palmer Street. The station is close to several government offices. The station is not wheelchair accessible. St James’s Park is one of two tube stations serving Buckingham Palace, the other being Green Park.

== History ==
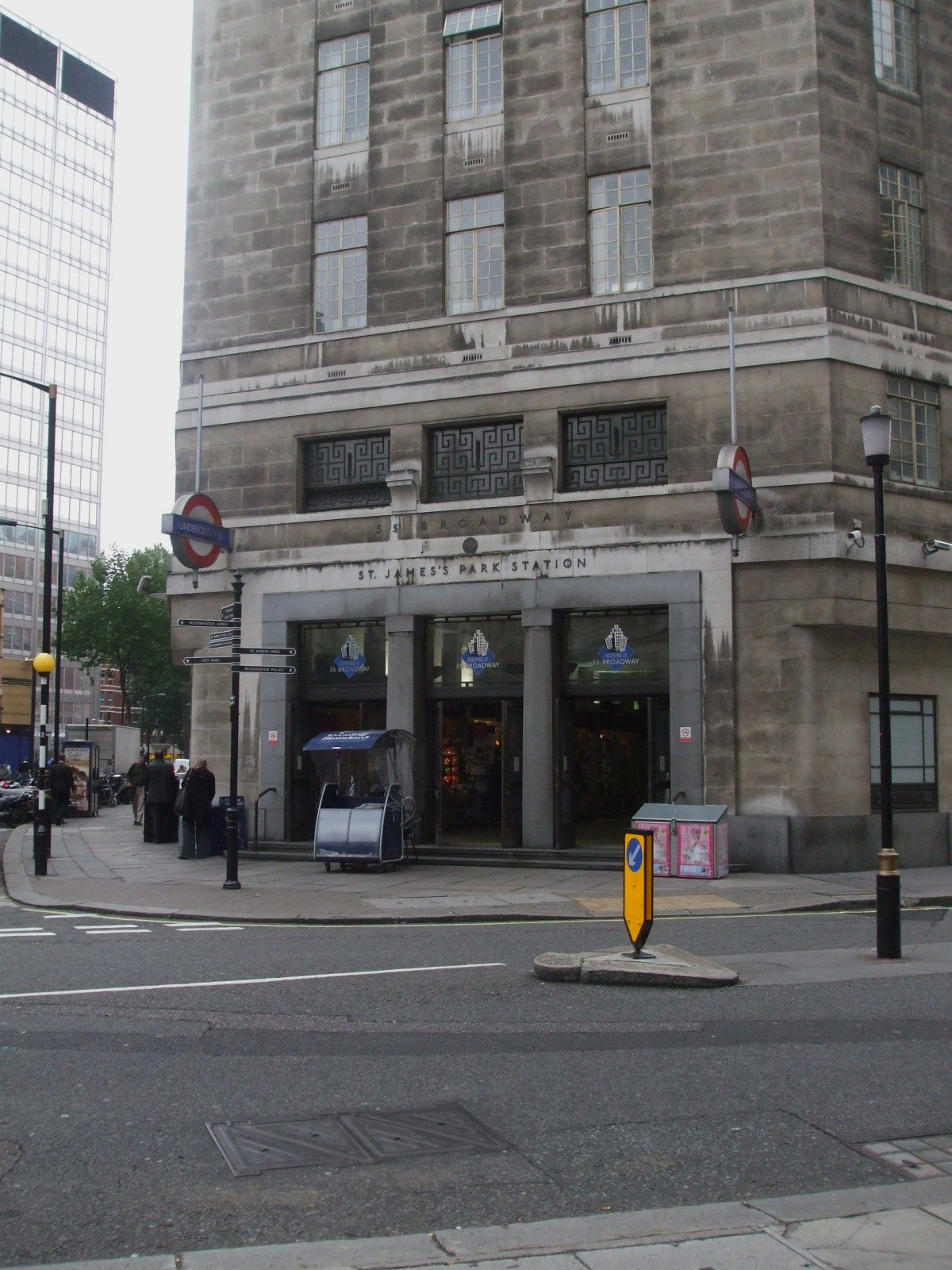
Entrance on Broadway

The station was opened on 24 December 1868 by the District Railway (DR, now the District line) when the company opened the first section of its line between South Kensington and Westminster stations. The DR connected to the Metropolitan Railway (MR, later the Metropolitan line) at South Kensington and, although the two companies were rivals, each company operated its trains over the other's tracks in a joint service known as the "Inner Circle".

On 1 February 1872, the DR opened a northbound branch from its station at Earl's Court to connect to the West London Extension Joint Railway (WLEJR, now the West London Line) which it connected to at Addison Road (now Kensington (Olympia)). From that date the "Outer Circle" service began running over the DR's tracks. The service was run by the North London Railway (NLR) from its terminus at Broad Street (now demolished) close to Liverpool Street station in the City of London via the North London Line to Willesden Junction, then the West London Line to Addison Road and the DR to Mansion House, the new eastern terminus of the DR.

From 1 August 1872, the "Middle Circle" service also began operations through St James's Park running from Moorgate along the MR's tracks on the north side of the Inner Circle to Paddington then over the Hammersmith & City Railway (H&CR) track to Latimer Road then, via a now demolished link, to the West London Line to Addison Road and the DR to Mansion House. The service was operated jointly by the H&CR and the DR. On 30 June 1900, the Middle Circle service was withdrawn between Earl's Court and Mansion House. On 31 December 1908 the Outer Circle service was also withdrawn.

The station has been reconstructed twice. In the first decade of the 20th century the original DR station was reconstructed in conjunction with the building of Electric Railway House a headquarters building for the DR's owners the London Electric Railway. The station was then rebuilt again between 1927 and 1929 as part of the construction of 55 Broadway the company's new headquarters building designed by Charles Holden and featuring statues and carved stone panels including ones by Sir Jacob Epstein, Eric Gill, and Henry Moore.

The platforms feature the green, blue, black and white tiling scheme first used for the reconstruction and extension to Morden of the City & South London Railway (now the Northern line) also designed by Holden and opened between 1924 and 1926.

In 1949, the Metropolitan line operated Inner Circle route was given its own identity on the tube map as the Circle line. The separate Palmer Street entrance and booking hall were rebuilt as part of a further redevelopment in the 1960s. Together with 55 Broadway, the station is a Grade I listed building.

== Name ==
Over time, the station name has been spelt and punctuated differently, illustrating changing practice in punctuation. Tube maps up to the early 1930s show the name as "St. James' Park". From Harry Beck's first map in 1933 until the early 1950s the name was shown as "St. James Park". From 1951, it was "St. James's Park". Current practice on tube maps is "St James's Park" without the full stop after the "St".

== Connections ==
London Buses routes 11, 24, 148 and night routes N2, N11, N44, N52 and N136 serve the station.

Preceding station	London Underground	Following station
Victoria towards Edgware Road	Circle line	Westminster towards Hammersmith via Tower Hill
Victoria towards Wimbledon, Richmond or Ealing Broadway	District line	Westminster towards Upminster
