= Sloane Square tube station =

London Underground station

Sloane Square
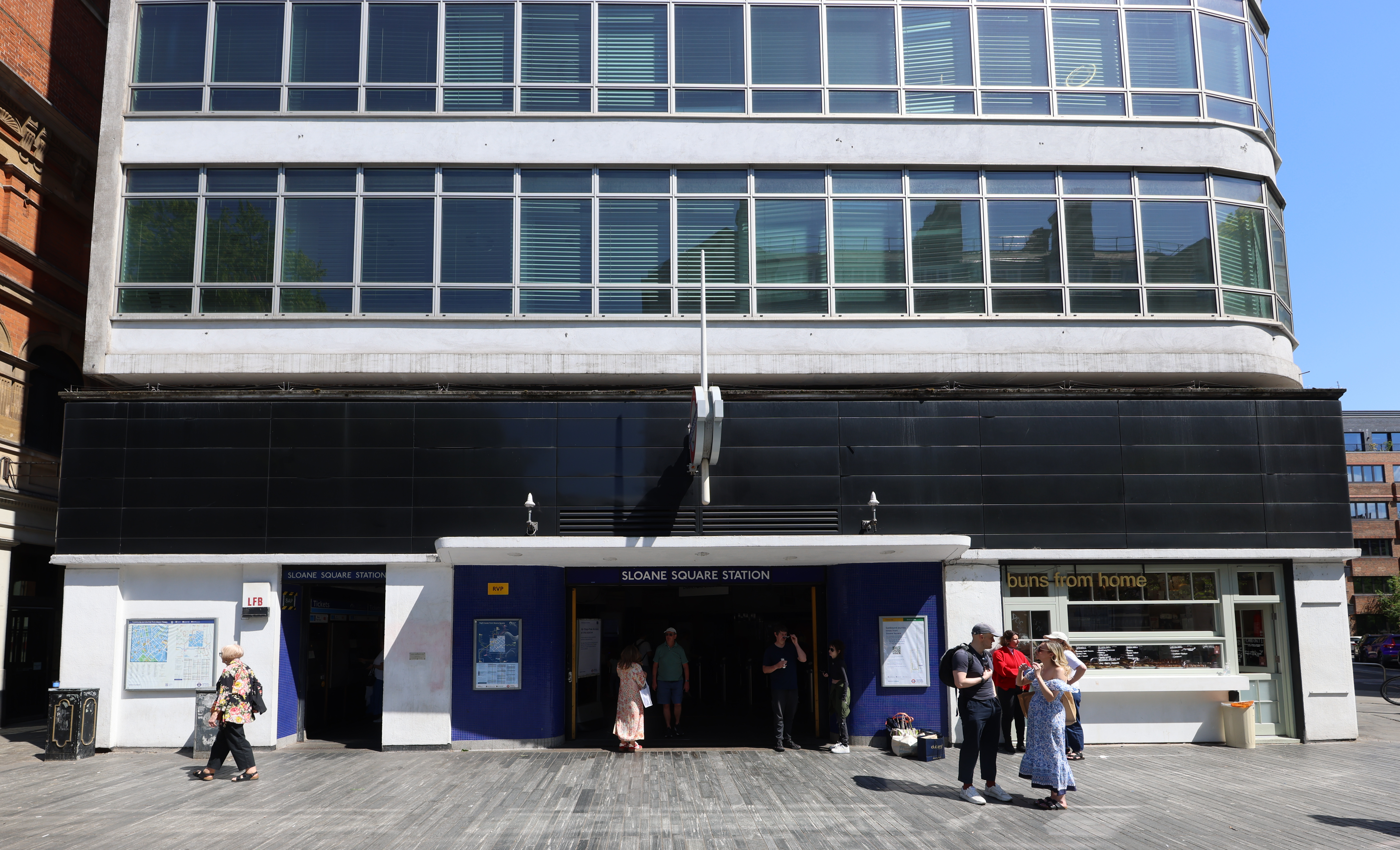
- Station entrance
- Interactive map of Sloane Square

General information
- Location: Chelsea
- Local authority: Royal Borough of Kensington and Chelsea
- Managed by: London Underground
- Number of platforms: 2
- Fare zone: 1

London Underground annual entry and exit
- 2021: ▲7.38 million
- 2022: ▲12.77 million
- 2023: ▲13.16 million
- 2024: ▲13.64 million
- 2025: ▲14.69 million

Key dates
- 24 December 1868: Opened (DR)
- 1 February 1872: Started "Outer Circle" (LNWR)
- 1 August 1872: Started "Middle Circle" (GWR)
- 30 June 1900: Ended "Middle Circle"
- 31 December 1908: Ended "Outer Circle"

Other information
- External links: TfL station info page
- Coordinates: 51.4925°N 0.1566°W

Sloane Square (/ˈsloʊn ˈskwɛər/) is a London Underground station in Chelsea, serving Sloane Square. It is on the Circle and District lines, between South Kensington and Victoria stations. It is in London fare zone 1.

The entrance to the station is located on the east side of Sloane Square (A3217). It is adjacent to the Royal Court Theatre and is the nearest station for King's Road shopping, the Peter Jones department store and the Cadogan Hall.

== History ==
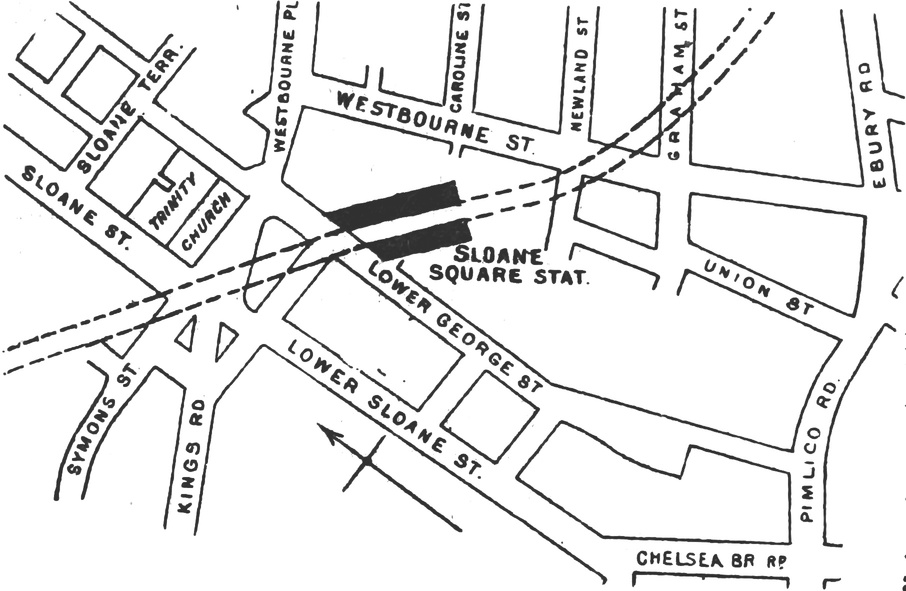
Plan of Sloane Square station, Sloane Square and surrounding streets, as they were in 1888

The station was opened on 24 December 1868 by the District Railway (DR, now the District line) when the company opened the first section of its line between South Kensington and Westminster stations.

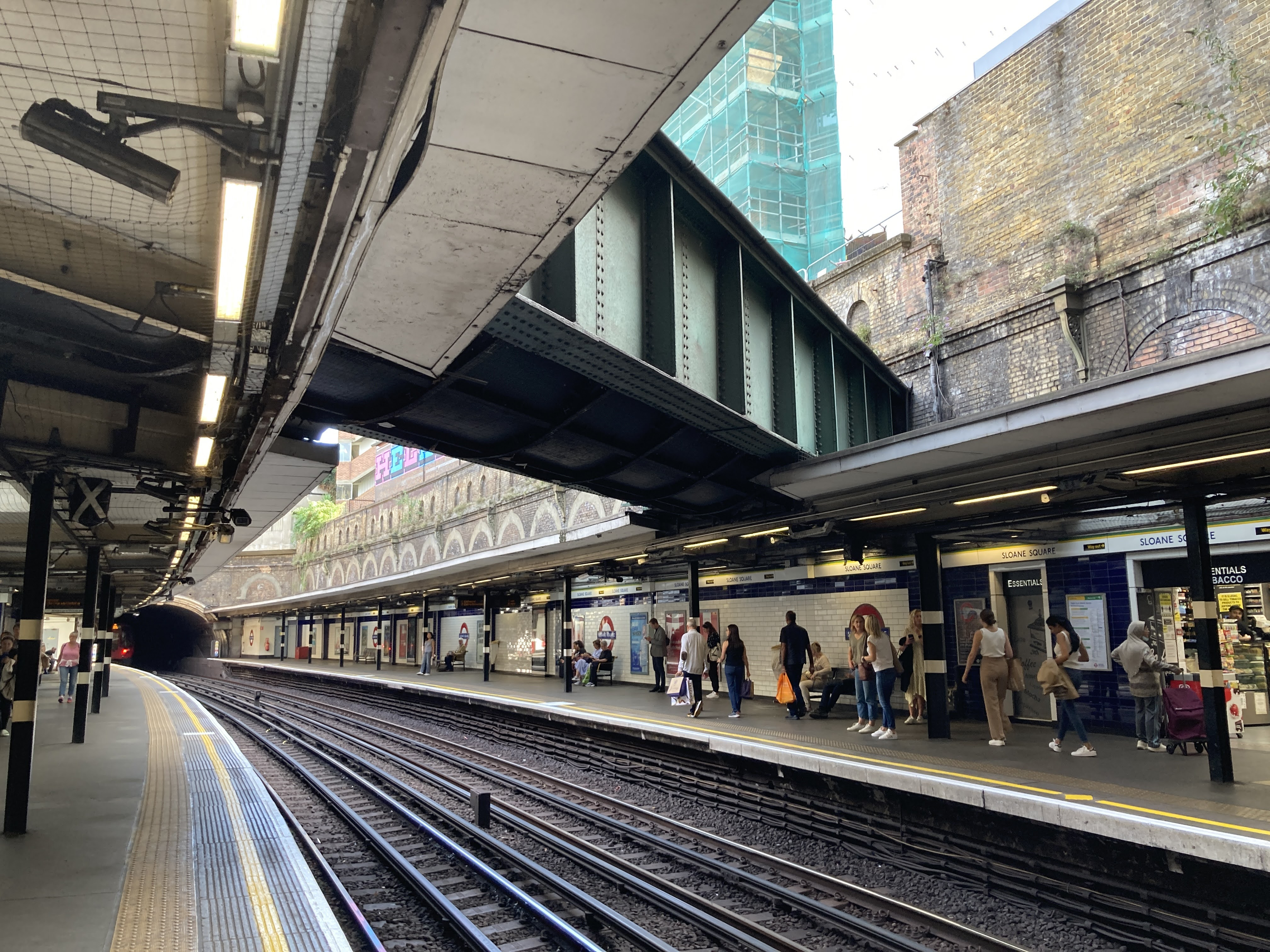
The River Westbourne, one of London's many subterranean rivers, flows above the station in a large iron conduit

The construction of the station was complicated by the crossing of the site by the River Westbourne which ran through Hyde Park as the Serpentine Lake and was originally crossed by the Knight's Bridge at Knightsbridge. The river was carried above the platform in a large iron pipe suspended from girders. This pipe remains in place today.

The DR connected to the Metropolitan Railway (MR, later the Metropolitan line) at South Kensington and, although the two companies were rivals, each company operated its trains over the other's tracks in a joint service known as the "Inner Circle".

On 1 February 1872, the DR opened a northbound branch from its station at Earl's Court to connect to the West London Extension Joint Railway (WLEJR, now the West London line) to which it connected at Addison Road (now Kensington (Olympia)). From that date the "Outer Circle" service began running over the DR's tracks. The service was run by the London and North Western Railway (LNWR) from Broad Street (now demolished) in the City of London via the North London line to Willesden Junction, then the West London Line to Addison Road. From Addison Road it ran over DR tracks to Mansion House.

From 1 August 1872, the "Middle Circle" service also began operations through Sloane Square running from Moorgate along the MR's tracks on the north side of the Inner Circle to Paddington then over the Hammersmith & City Railway (H&CR) track to Latimer Road then, via a now demolished link, to the West London line to Addison Road and the DR to Mansion House. The service was operated by the Great Western Railway.

On 30 June 1900, the Middle Circle service was withdrawn between Earl's Court and Mansion House. On 31 December 1908, the Outer Circle service was also withdrawn.

In the late 1930s, the station building was rebuilt in the modern style. Escalators were installed between the ticket hall and the platforms in early 1940, making the station the first on the sub-surface network to have escalators. The new station building did not last long as it was mostly destroyed during World War II. A German bomb that fell in November 1940 killed 37 and injured 79 passengers on a train in the station and destroyed the ticket hall, escalators and the glazed roof over the tracks.

In 1949, the Metropolitan line operated Inner Circle route was given its own identity on the tube map as the Circle line. By 1951 the station had been rebuilt again in a similar style to the 1930s building. The arched glass roof was not replaced and the current station does not have the light open atmosphere of the original. The office building above the station entrance is a later addition.

The Hole in the Wall pub on the eastbound platform existed from 1868 to 1985.

=== Incidents and accidents ===
On 5 April 1960, Peter Llewelyn Davies, one of the Llewelyn Davies boys who were the inspiration for the boy characters of J. M. Barrie's Peter Pan, or The Boy Who Wouldn't Grow Up, and who resented the public association with the character named after him, committed suicide by throwing himself under a train as it was pulling into the station.

On 26 December 1973, a terrorist bomb exploded in the telephone kiosk in the booking office. No one was injured.

=== Former Chelsea-Hackney line proposal ===
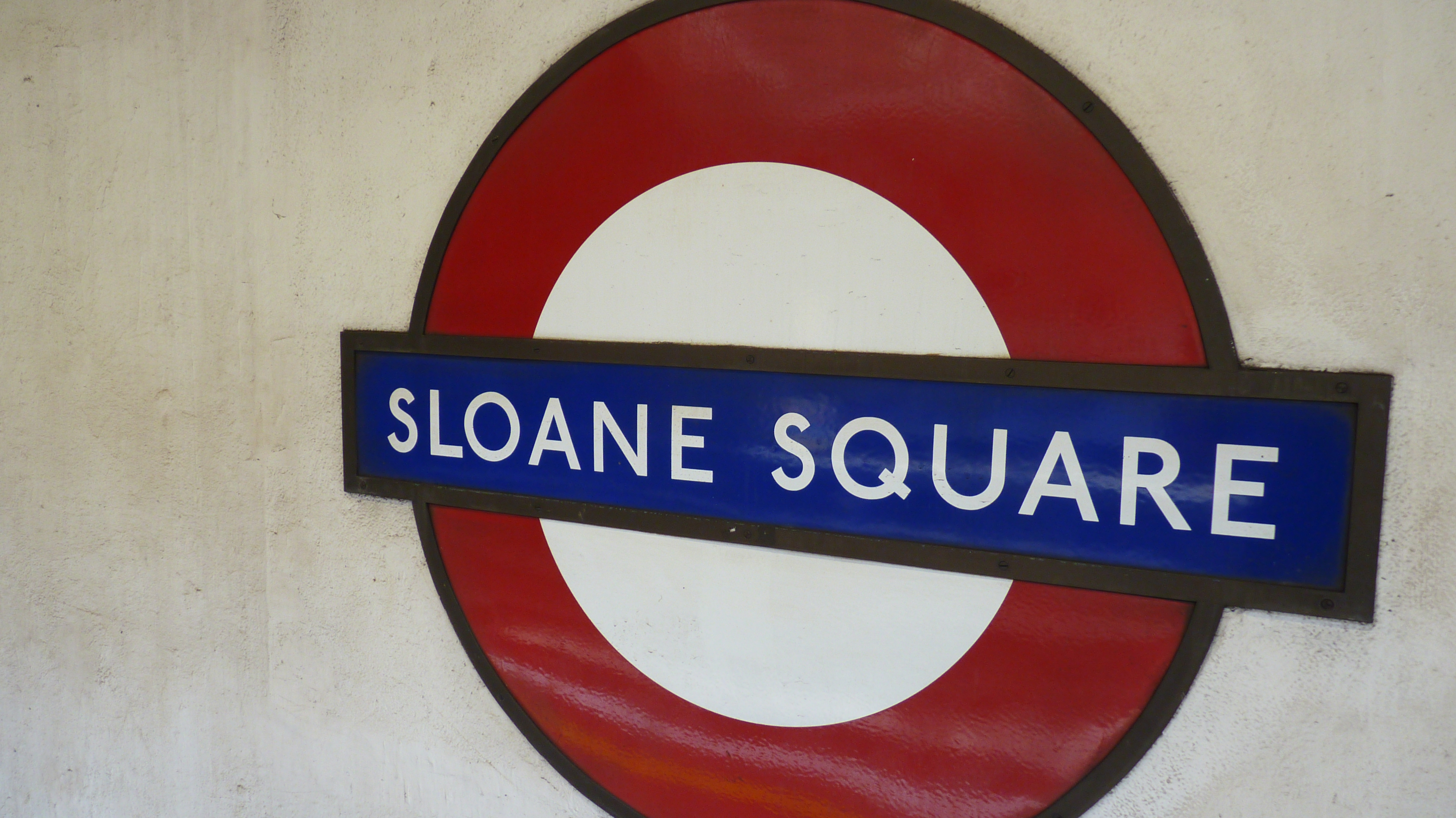
Sloane Square station roundel

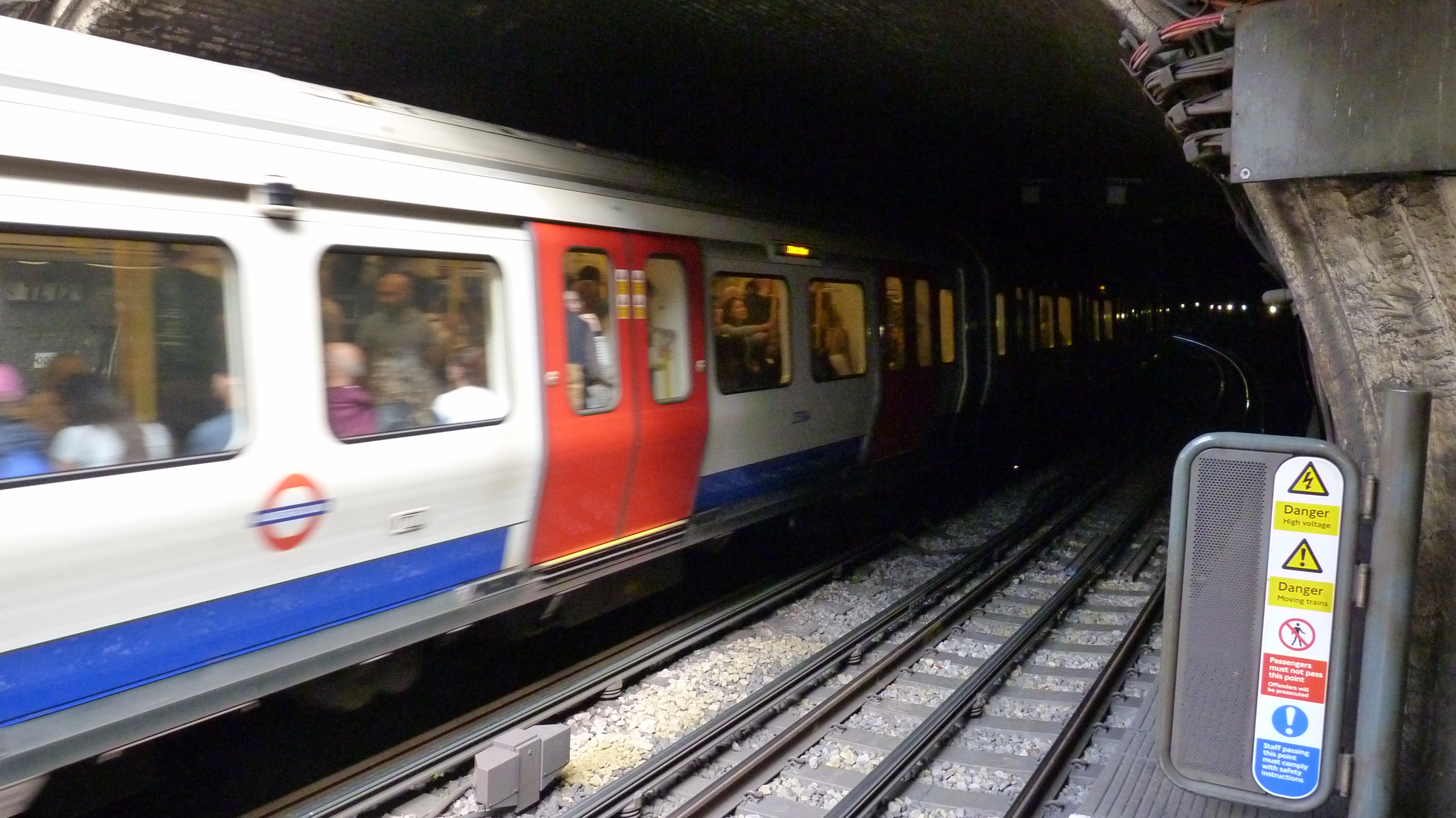
A District line train departing the station

Sloane Square was considered as a potential station on the long-proposed Chelsea-Hackney line which has been absorbed into plans for Crossrail 2. The station is no longer on the planned route.

== Connections ==
Several London Buses routes serve the station, with a number of them running through the night.

== In popular culture ==
Sloane Square is one of two tube stations (the other being South Kensington) mentioned in the song "When you're lying awake" from the operetta Iolanthe by Gilbert and Sullivan.

Preceding station	London Underground	Following station
South Kensington towards Edgware Road	Circle line	Victoria towards Hammersmith via Tower Hill
South Kensington towards Wimbledon, Richmond or Ealing Broadway	District line	Victoria towards Upminster
