= Shepherd's Bush railway station (1874–1916) =

Former railway station in England

Shepherd's Bush
- Shepherds Bush Station looking east, July 1916, shortly after closure

- Location of Shepherd's Bush in Greater London
- Location: Shepherd's Bush
- Owner: London and South Western Railway
- Number of platforms: 2

Key dates
- 1 May 1874: Opened
- 5 June 1916: Closed
- Replaced by: none

Other information
- Coordinates: 51.5022°N 0.2241°W

Shepherd's Bush is a closed London and South Western Railway (L&SWR) station in Shepherd's Bush, west London. The station was situated on the L&SWR's line between Richmond (now the District line) and the West London Joint Railway (WLJR). It was between Hammersmith (Grove Road) station and Addison Road (now Kensington Olympia) station.

== History ==
Stations around Shepherd's Bush

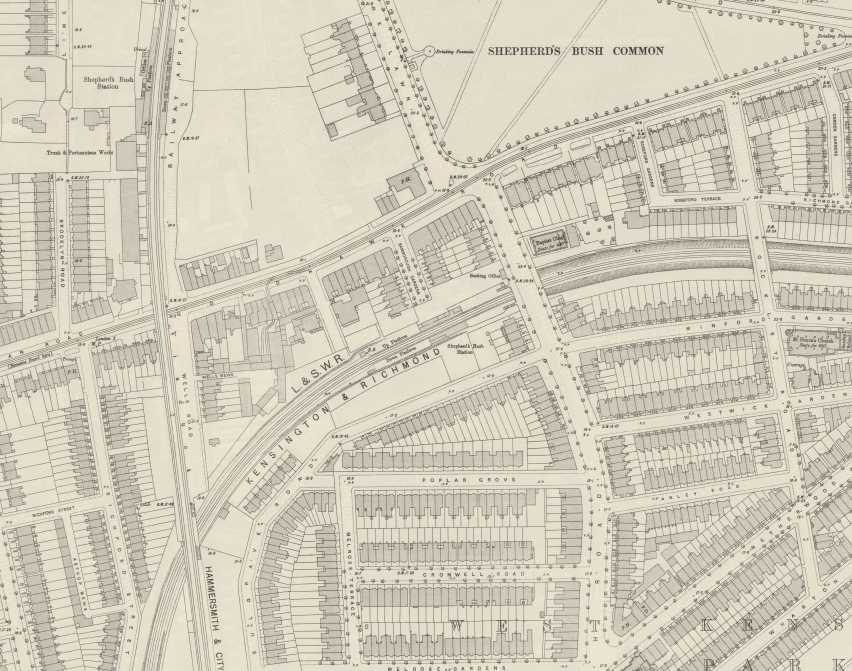
Shepherd's Bush station on an Ordnance Survey map, 1894

The L&SWR opened the line through the station on 1 January 1869. The line ran in an arc with the station near its apex, located in a shallow cutting on the west side of Shepherd's Bush Road (A219) adjacent to Sulgrave Road. The station opened on 1 May 1874.

Services to central London ran via a circuitous route to Waterloo and the station was, from its beginning, subject to competition for passengers from the more direct routes available from nearby Metropolitan Railway (MR) stations at Shepherd's Bush Market (then called simply Shepherd's Bush), and Uxbridge Road. On the section of the Richmond line to the west through Ravenscourt Park and Turnham Green the L&SWR service competed, from 1877, with the District Railway's (DR's, now the District line) more direct service via Earl's Court.

Competition became stronger when the Central London Railway (CLR, now the Central line) opened its own station just to the north of Shepherd's Bush Green in 1900 and the MR opened a new station at Goldhawk Road in 1914. The L&SWR station and line closed on 5 June 1916.

In 1919, the CLR published plans to build a tunneled link to the disused L&SWR tracks south-west of the station so that it might run trains to Richmond via Hammersmith (Grove Road) station and Turnham Green. Although authorization was granted in 1920, the connection was never realized.

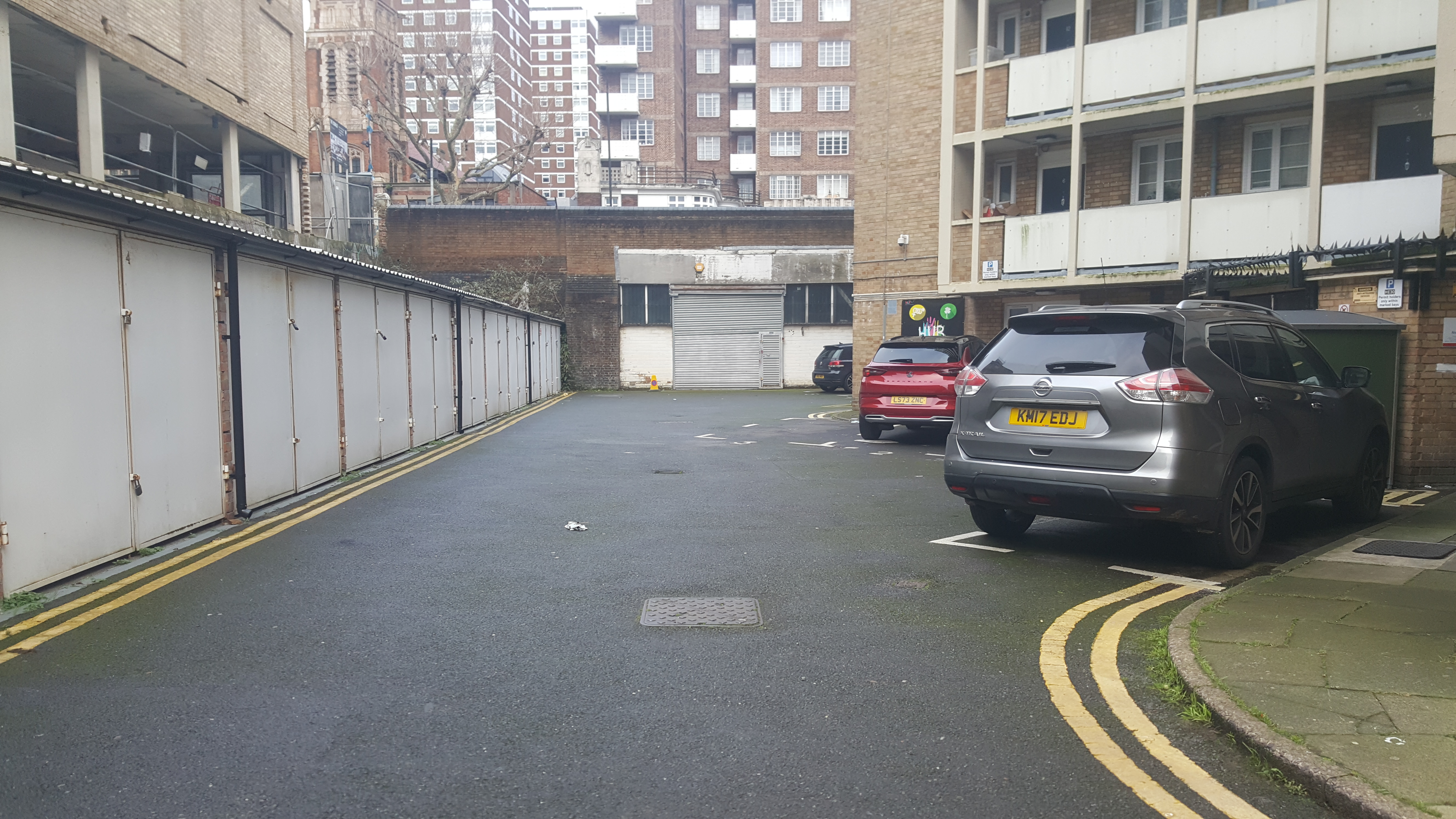
The site of Shepherd's Bush in 2024

The route was finally abandoned around 1930 to enable the extension of the Piccadilly line to take over the track between Ravenscourt Park and Turnham Green. The tracks between Ravenscourt Park and Kensington Olympia were removed in 1932 and the land was sold for redevelopment. The derelict platforms and parts of the buildings remained into the late 1950s/early 60s, when the site was cleared for redevelopment for construction of a block of flats. Much of the route has been built on in the following decades, so little is left to indicate the route, except for the curving alignment of Sulgrave Road and Minford Gardens, and the bridge in Shepherd's Bush Road where it crossed over the tracks.

== See also ==
- Shepherd's Bush stations

Preceding station	Disused railways	Following station
Hammersmith (Grove Road); Line and station closed	London and South Western Railway	Addison Road; Line closed, station open
