= St Quintin Park & Wormwood Scrubs railway station =

Former railway station in England

St. Quintin Park & Wormwood Scrubs
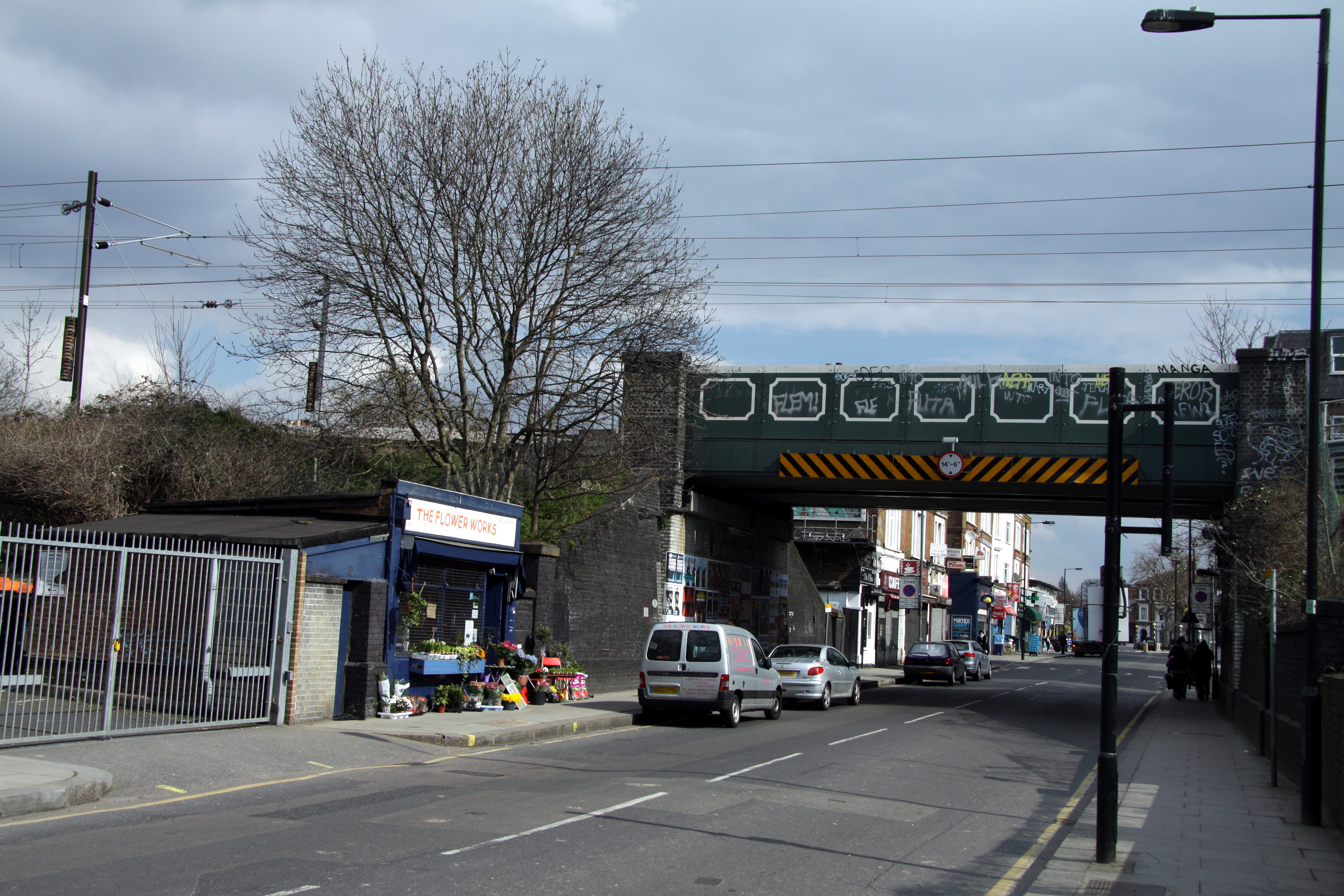
- The former entrance to the station on North Pole Road
- Interactive map of St. Quintin Park & Wormwood Scrubs

General information
- Location: Wormwood Scrubs
- Local authority: Hammersmith & Fulham
- Grid reference: TQ230816
- Number of platforms: 2

Railway companies
- Original company: West London Railway
- Pre-grouping: West London Railway
- Post-grouping: West London Railway

Key dates
- 1 August 1871: Opened as Wormwood Scrubs
- 1 August 1892: Renamed St. Quintin Park & Wormwood Scrubs
- 1 November 1893: Resited
- 3 October 1940: Closed

Other information
- Coordinates: 51.5204°N 0.2279°W

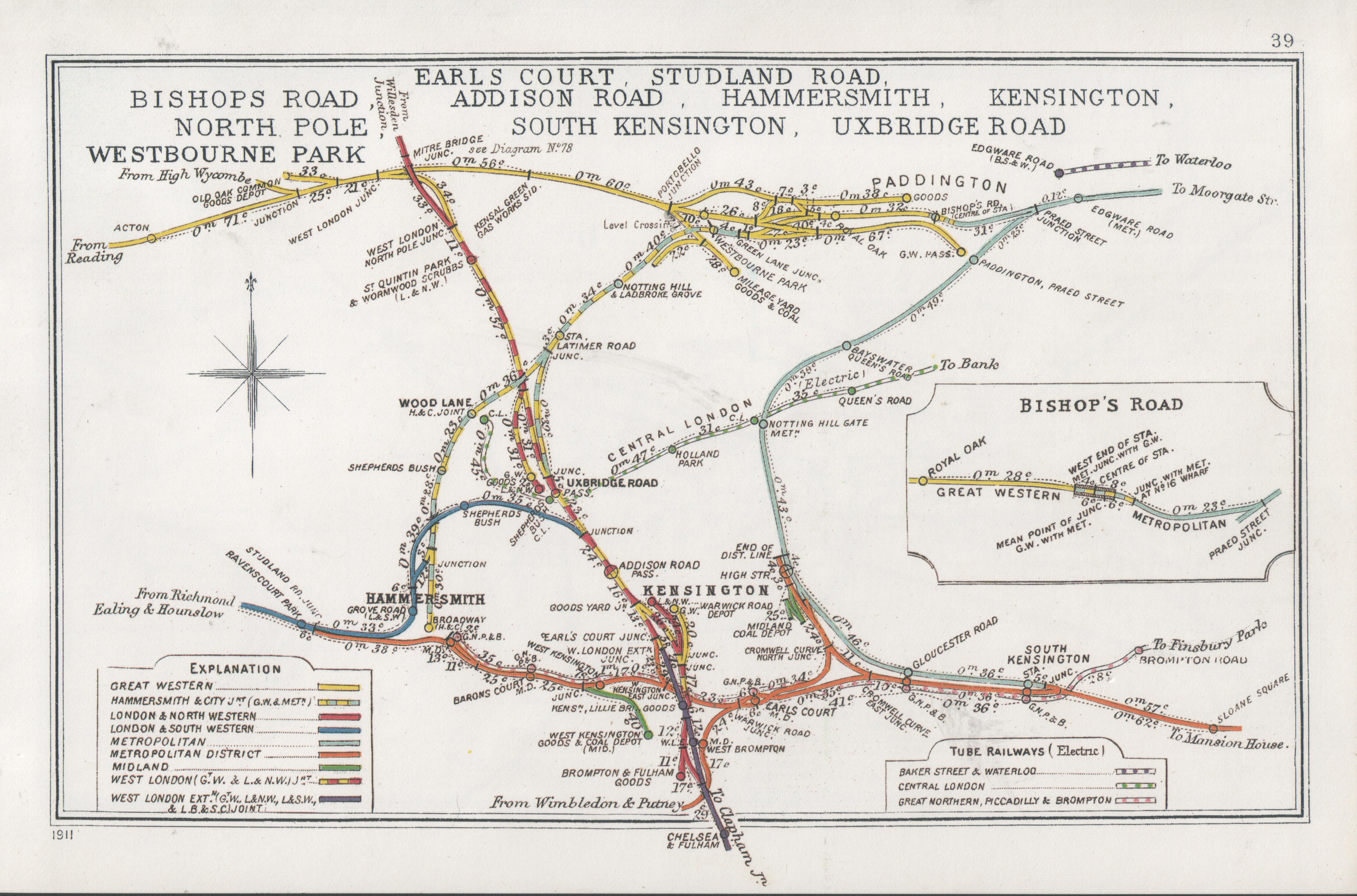
A 1911 diagram showing the station location (upper left, in red) in west London

St. Quintin Park & Wormwood Scrubs was a railway station on the West London Railway on the border of North Kensington and Hammersmith & Fulham, West London. It was situated on an embankment next to North Pole Road, close to the road's junction with Wood Lane and near Wormwood Scrubs in what is now the London Borough of Hammersmith and Fulham.

The station was located on two different sites during its history. The original station building and platforms, constructed mostly of wood, opened on 1 August 1871 with the name Wormwood Scrubs, alternatively spelt Wormwood Scrubbs, but closed on 1 November 1893 and the station was resited 100 yards (91 m) further north, to the north side of North Pole Road. It had been renamed St. Quintin Park & Wormwood Scrubs on 1 August 1892. Under that name it remained operational until it was struck by an incendiary bomb on the 3rd Oct 1940, and destroyed by fire. The second station, also of wooden construction, burned away and its remains were demolished.

Most electric trains on the present-day West London Line stop near the site of the former station to change current collection method, as the line to the north is electrified by AC overhead lines and to the south by DC third rail. In 2009 local authority leaders lobbied the government to build a new station a short distance to the north of the disused one. To date such plans have not materialised.

Preceding station	Disused railways	Following station
Uxbridge Road	West London Railway	Willesden Junction
