= Uxbridge Road tube station =

Former London tube station

Uxbridge Road
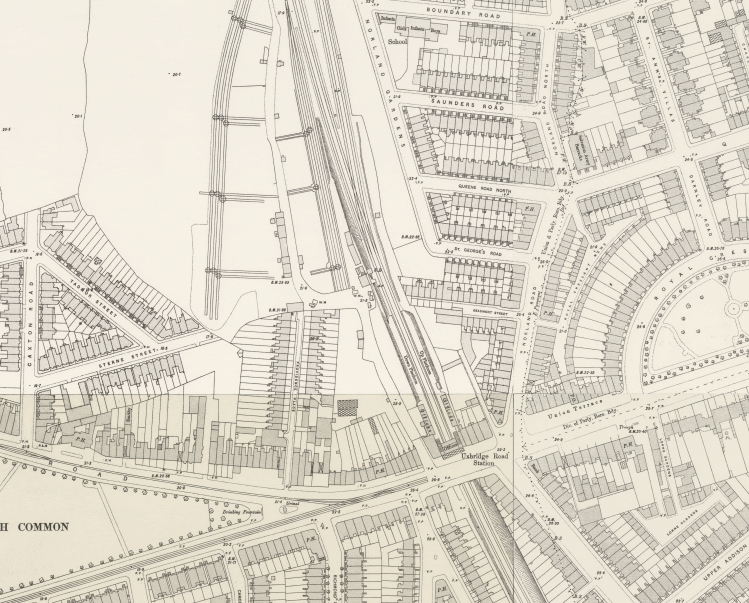
- 1895 Map showing location of Uxbridge Road station close to Shepherd's Bush Green
- Interactive map of Uxbridge Road

General information
- Location: Shepherd's Bush
- Local authority: Hammersmith and Fulham
- Grid reference: TQ238799
- Number of platforms: 2

Railway companies
- Original company: West London Railway
- Pre-grouping: West London Railway
- Post-grouping: West London Railway

Key dates
- 1 November 1869: Station opened
- 21 October 1940: Station closed
- Replaced by: Shepherd's Bush

Other information
- Coordinates: 51.5054°N 0.2169°W

Uxbridge Road was a railway station on the West London Railway from 1869 to 1940. It was initially served by London & North Western Railway and the Great Western Railway. In 1905 the line became a branch of the Metropolitan Railway, and later London Underground's Metropolitan line. Uxbridge Road station closed on 21 October 1940 during World War II, when the West London Line was put out of service during the Blitz.

The station was located at the eastern end of the Uxbridge Road in Shepherd's Bush, west London, UK, just before the start of Holland Park Avenue, a short distance from Shepherd's Bush station on the Central line. The station entrance was situated on the site of the present-day Holland Park roundabout.

== History ==
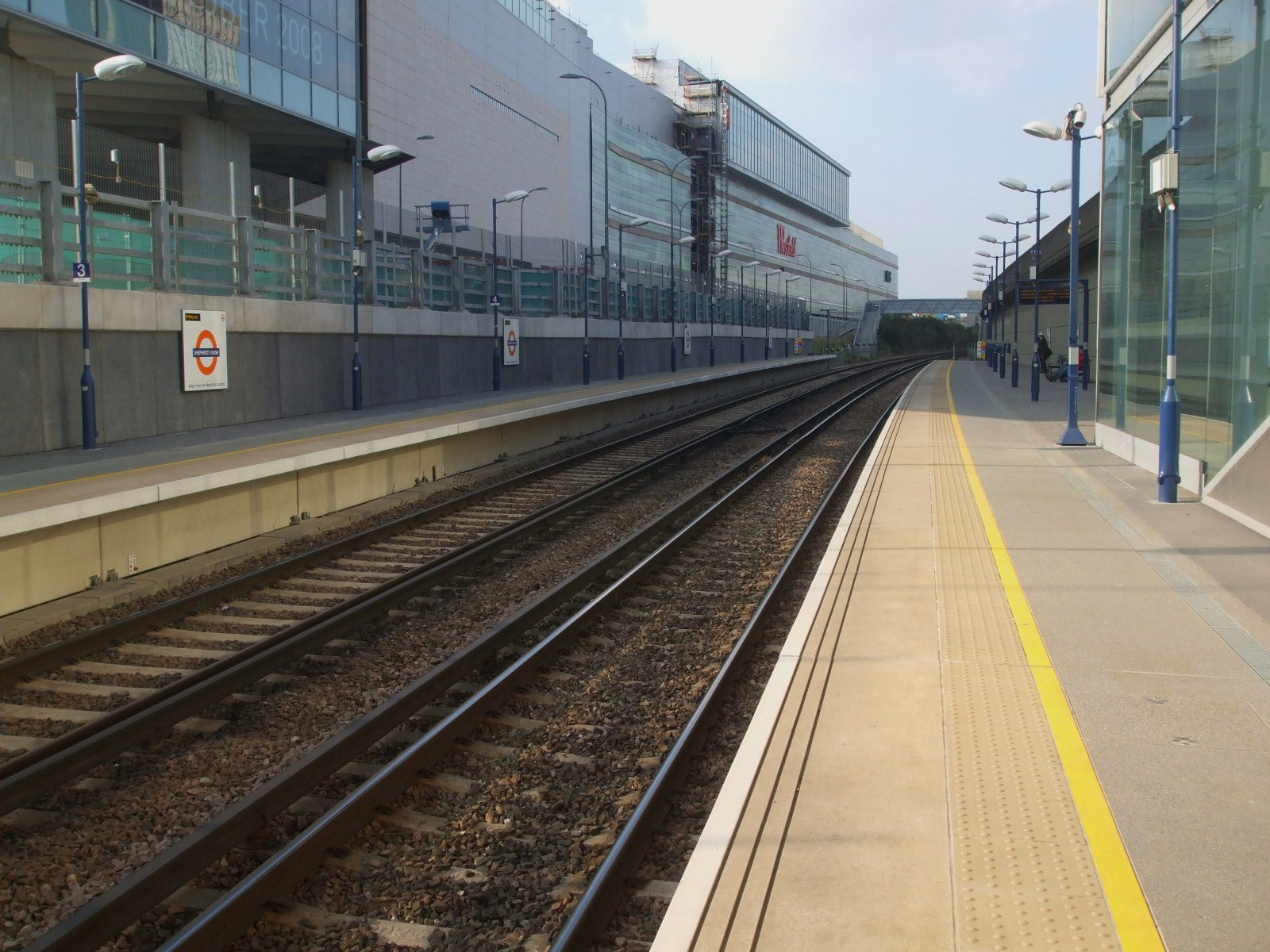
Looking north along the platforms of the new London Overground station to the site of the former Uxbridge Road station; the site of the station house is now covered by the Westfield shopping centre.

The Great Western Railway (GWR) opened the Hammersmith & City Railway (H&CR) on 13 June 1864, and from 1 July 1864 carriages from Kensington (Addison Road) (now Kensington [Olympia]) were attached and detached from trains at Notting Hill; through services between Kensington and the City of London beginning in April 1865. A station had been built on the chord linking the H&CR and West London Railway, but this never opened due to GWR objections. Following an agreement between the Metropolitan Railway and GWR in August 1868, Uxbridge Road station, designed by the London & North Western Railway (L&NWR), opened on the West London Railway on 1 November 1869. A GWR service from Great Western Main Line suburban stations to Victoria station passing through the station also stopped, with up to eleven services a day, initially from Southall and Reading.

Stations in Shepherd's Bush area

In 1872 the GWR Addison Road service was extended to Mansion House over the District Railway, becoming the 'middle circle'. This terminated at Earl's Court from 1900, and from 1905 was replaced by a shuttle between Hammersmith & City stations and Addison Road. The shuttle was replaced in 1907 by four electric trains an hour from Addison Road to Aldgate. This service appears on the first 'London Underground' map in 1908 as a Metropolitan Railway service. The GWR service to Victoria was withdrawn after 1915, but they were to provide a workman's service from Greenford to Kensington from 1922 to 1938.

Also from 1872 a L&NWR 'outer circle' service from Broad Street to Mansion House passed through the station. In 1909 the L&NWR also ran several through trains to Southern England over the line, and some called at Uxbridge Road. The outer circle was cut back to Earl's Court in 1909 and by 1914, when electric services began, was a Willesden Junction to Earl's Court shuttle. The service from Earl's Court to Uxbridge Road appears on the first 'London Underground' map in 1908 as a District Railway service.

The West London Railway was bombed several times in September and October 1940, and closed 21 October 1940. Passenger services over the entire line did not restart after the war.

== Resurrection of station ==
As part of the redevelopment of the White City site, a new main line and London Overground station named Shepherd's Bush opened in 2008, on part of the site of the original Uxbridge Road station site as an interchange with Shepherd's Bush Central line station.

== See also ==
- Shepherd's Bush stations

Historical railways
Kensington (Addison Road)	West London Line	St. Quintin Park
Preceding station	London Underground	Following station
Kensington (Addison Road) Terminus	Metropolitan line Middle Circle branch	Latimer Road towards Barking
