= Shepherd's Bush railway station =

London Overground station

Shepherd's Bush
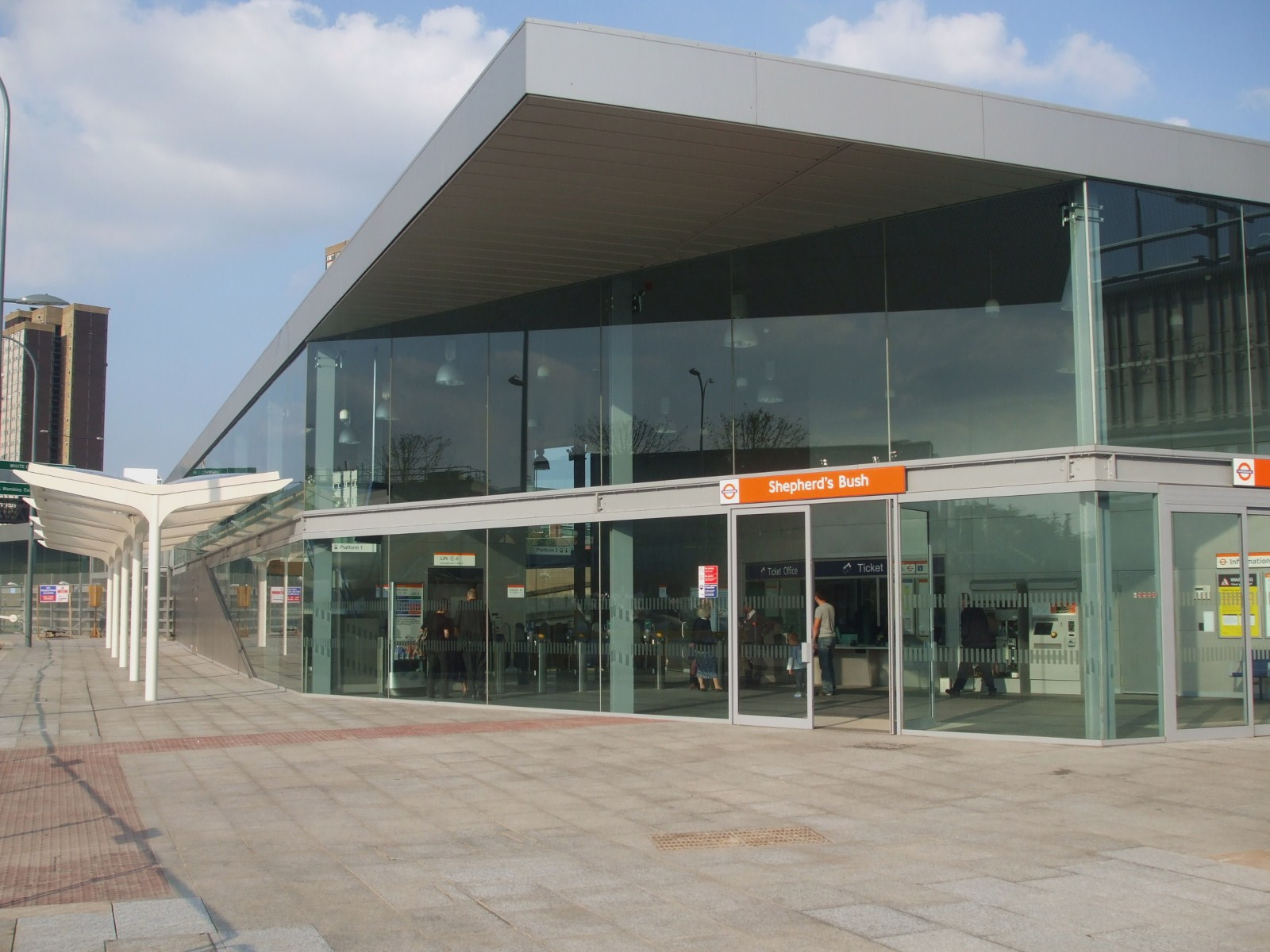
- Interactive map of Shepherd's Bush

General information
- Location: Shepherd's Bush
- Local authority: London Borough of Hammersmith and Fulham
- Managed by: London Overground
- Owner: Network Rail
- Station code: SPB
- DfT category: D
- Number of platforms: 2
- Accessible: Yes
- Fare zone: 2
- OSI: Shepherd's Bush

National Rail annual entry and exit
- 2020–21: ▼2.272 million
- Interchange: ▼3,749
- 2021–22: ▲5.009 million
- Interchange: ▲6,712
- 2022–23: ▲5.705 million
- Interchange: ▲15,841
- 2023–24: ▲6.493 million
- Interchange: ▲19,241
- 2024–25: ▲6.932 million
- Interchange: ▼10,289

Railway companies
- Original company: Network Rail

Key dates
- 29 September 2008: Opened

Other information
- External links: Departures; Facilities
- Coordinates: 51.505128°N 0.217561°W

Shepherd's Bush is an interchange station between the Mildmay line of the London Overground and National Rail services operated by Southern, located in Shepherd's Bush, West London. It opened on 29 September 2008 and lies within London fare zone 2.

A number of stations in the area both past and present have borne the name Shepherd's Bush; today the National Rail station shares its name with the adjacent Central line Shepherd's Bush, with which it shares a surface-level interchange.

An entirely separate London Underground station, Shepherd's Bush Market on the Circle line and Hammersmith & City line located approximately 500 metres (0.3 miles) away was originally called Shepherd's Bush. This station was renamed on 12 October 2008 to Shepherd's Bush Market to avoid confusion.

== History ==
Map showing layout of current and former railways and stations around Shepherd's Bush

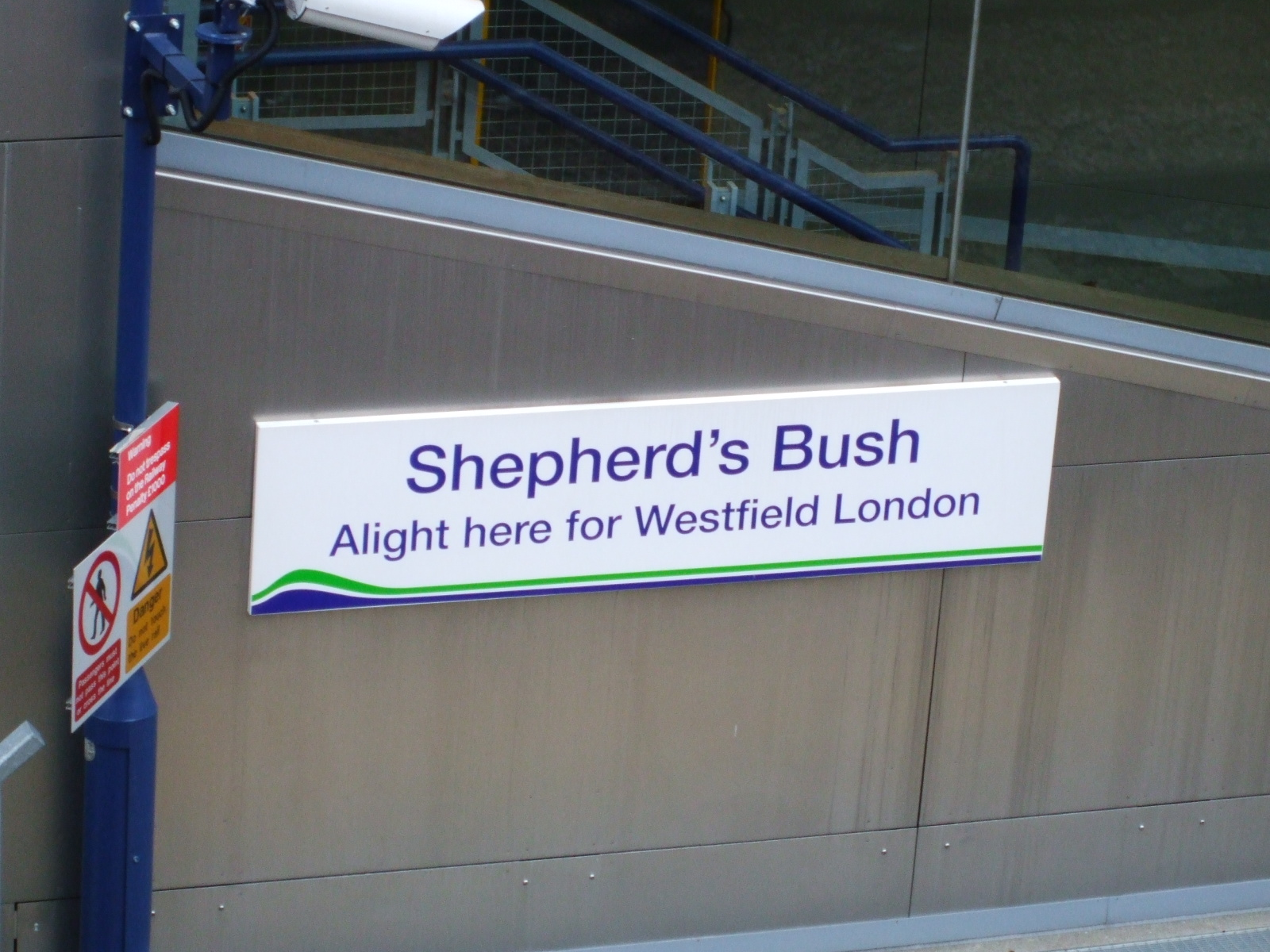
Original Silverlink signage installed in 2007.

Previously a station existed almost on the same site as the present Shepherd's Bush station. Uxbridge Road station was opened in 1869 by London & North Western Railway and the Great Western Railway on the Middle Circle route. In 1905 the line became branch of the Metropolitan Railway, and later London Underground's Metropolitan line. Uxbridge Road was closed in 1940 after the line was bombed several times during the Blitz.

In 2005, construction began on a major redevelopment project in the White City area, including the large-scale Westfield Shopping Centre, developed by the Westfield Group. Shepherd's Bush station was designed and funded by the Westfield Group as part of a Section 106 redevelopment contribution, and construction was project-managed by Capita Symonds; this project also included the provision of an integrated bus interchange and the reconstruction of the London Underground Central line station.

Building work on the West London line station began in early 2006 and it was due to open in summer 2007. Although largely completed on time, the station was unable to open due to the northbound platform being 460 millimetres (18 in) too narrow to comply with railway safety regulations, based on the anticipated number of passengers using the station. Following remedial reconstruction work on the platform, the station opened on 29 September 2008.

The three-letter station code SPB and location code 9587 appear on ticketing systems, and train times for the station began appearing on timetables from May 2007.

With a 2007 opening date in mind, the station was to have been served by Silverlink trains, and it was fitted out with Silverlink-branded signage. By the time the station actually opened to passenger service, the rail franchise had passed to London Overground, and the station signage was rebranded.

In April 2015 the station platforms were extended to accommodate longer, 8-car Southern trains, and a footbridge and a new entrance were constructed at the northern end of the station to ease passenger flows. The £1.35m station upgrade work was supported with £3.9 million from the Westfield Shopping Centre and the platform lengthening was part of a nine-month, £25 million project funded by Network Rail to extend platforms along the West London line.

== Services ==
Services on the Mildmay line of the London Overground operate using Class 378 EMUs; National Rail services along the West London line operated by Southern are run using related Class 377 EMUs.

The typical off-peak service in trains per hour is:

- 4 tph to Stratford via Willesden Junction (Mildmay line)
- 1 tph to Watford Junction (Southern)
- 4 tph to Clapham Junction (Mildmay line)
- 1 tph to East Croydon (Southern)

Additional services call at the station during the peak hours, including some trains that start/terminate here. During the late evenings, Mildmay line services run between Clapham Junction and Willesden Junction only.

Preceding station	National Rail	Following station
Wembley Central	Southern West London Line	Kensington (Olympia)
Preceding station	London Overground	Following station
Willesden Junction towards Stratford	Mildmay line West London line	Kensington (Olympia) towards Clapham Junction

== Connections ==
London Buses routes 31, 49, 72, 94, 95, 148, 207, 220, 228, 237, 260, 272, 295, 316, C1 and SL8 and night routes N72 and N207 serve the station.

== Gallery ==
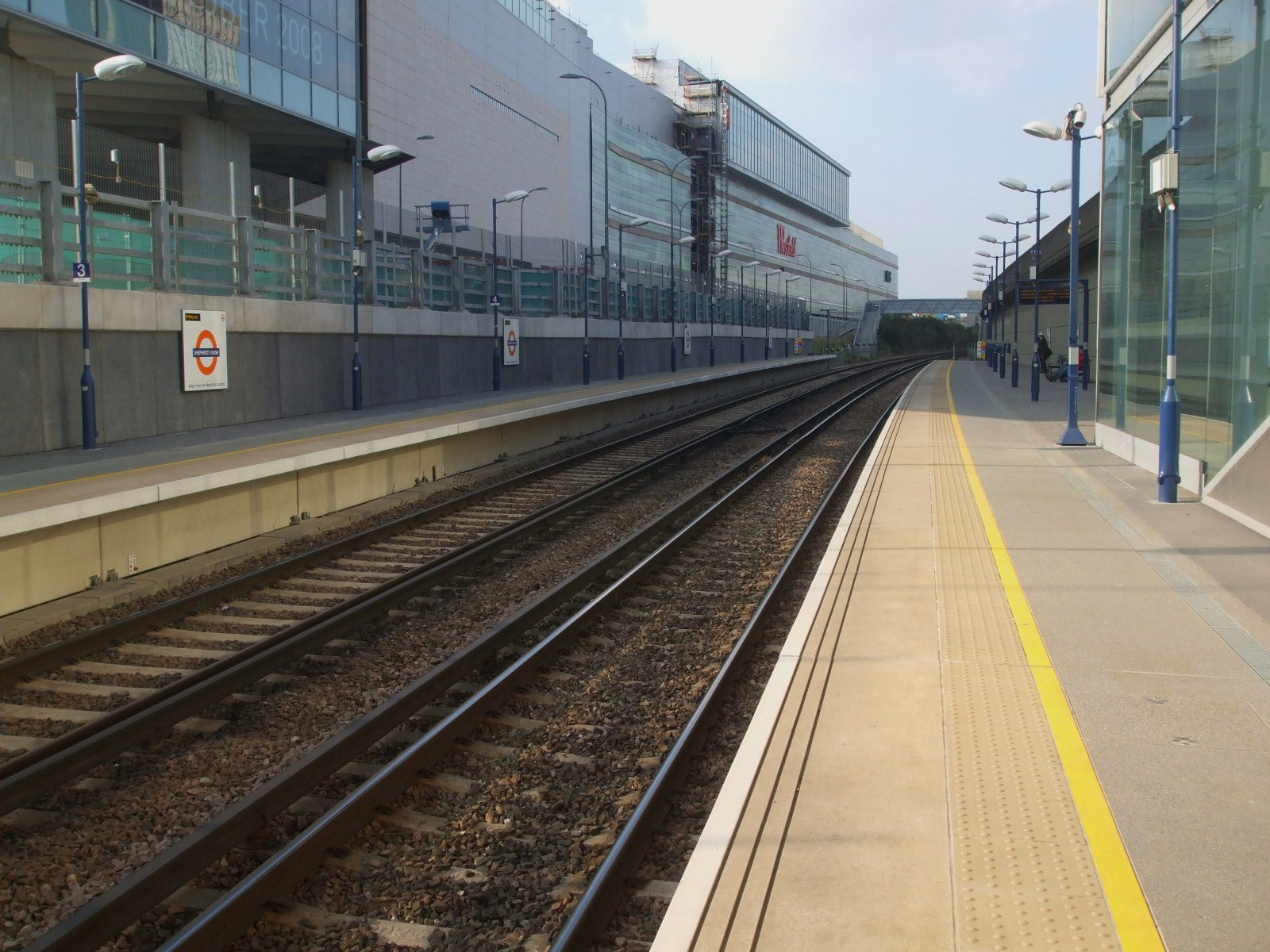
Platforms looking north

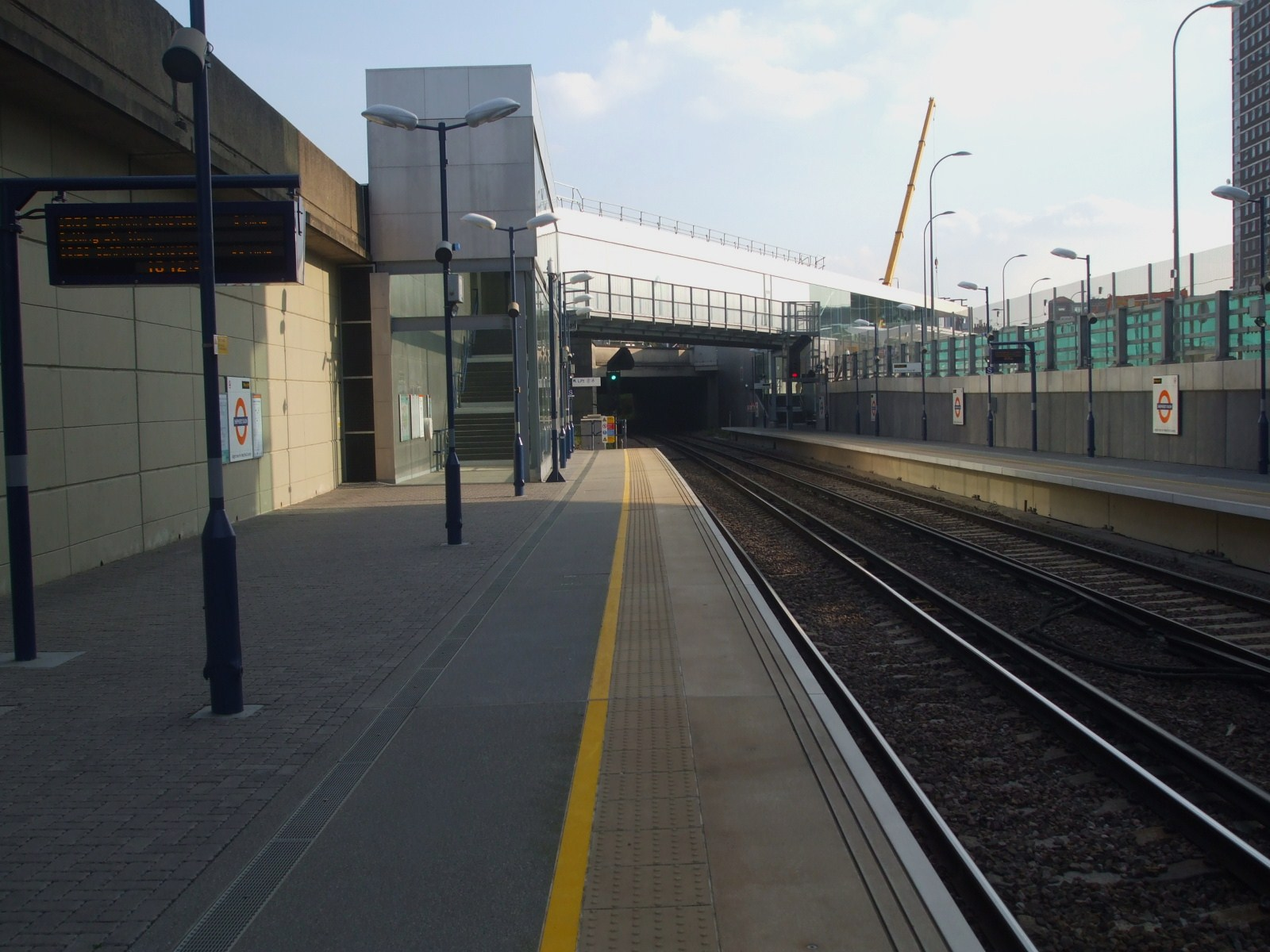
Platforms looking south

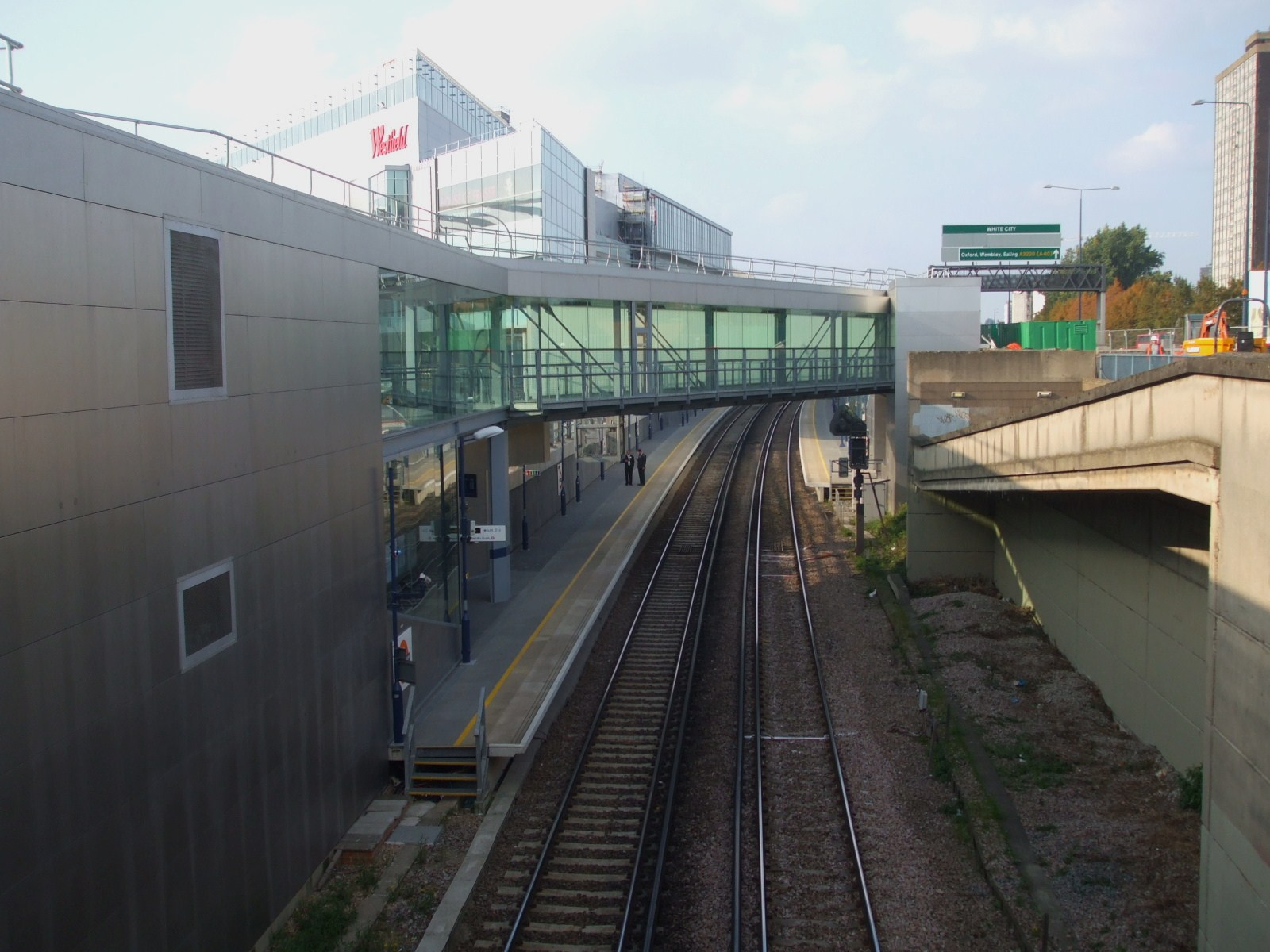
Station looking north from Uxbridge Road

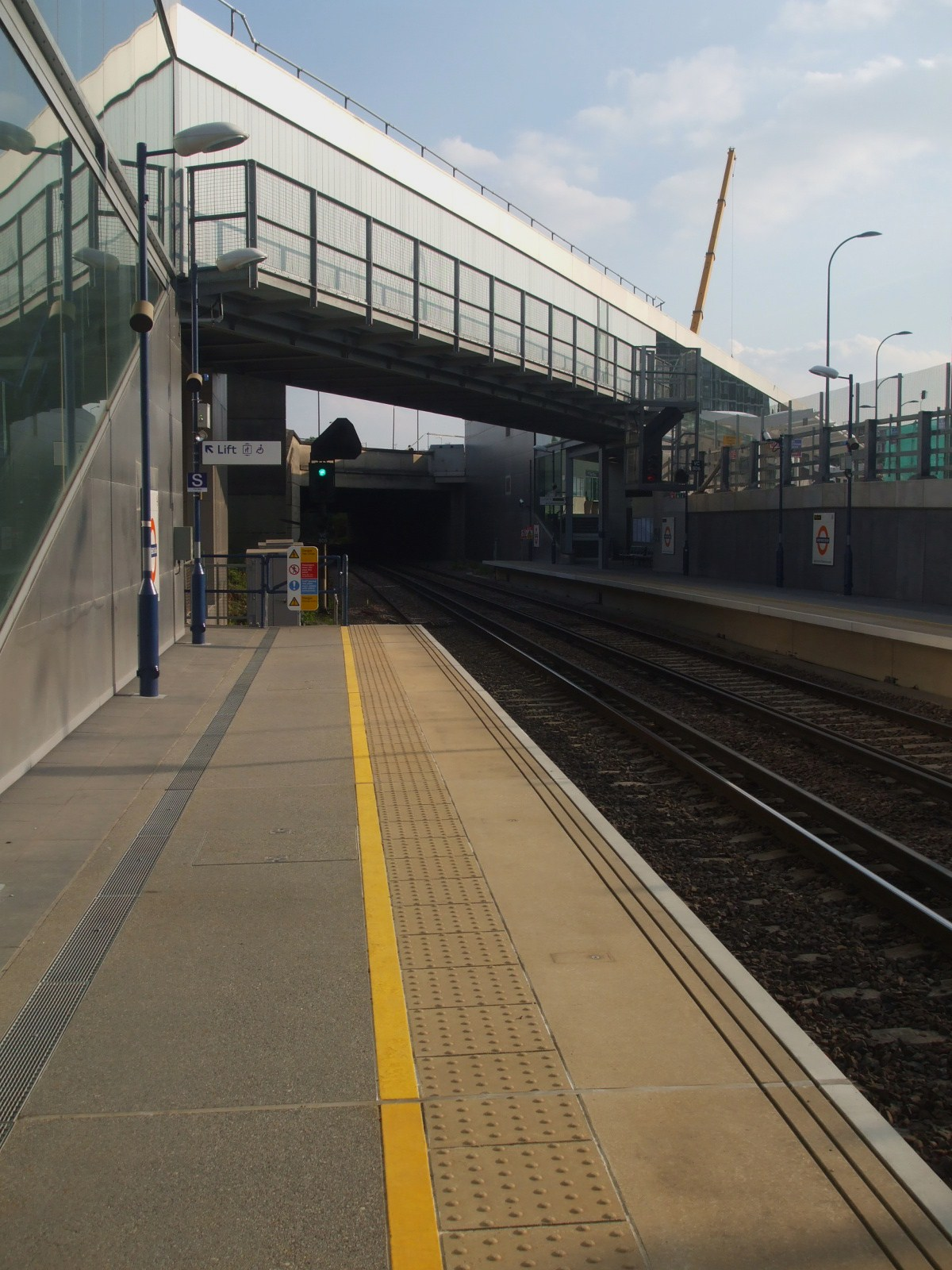
Footbridge looking south

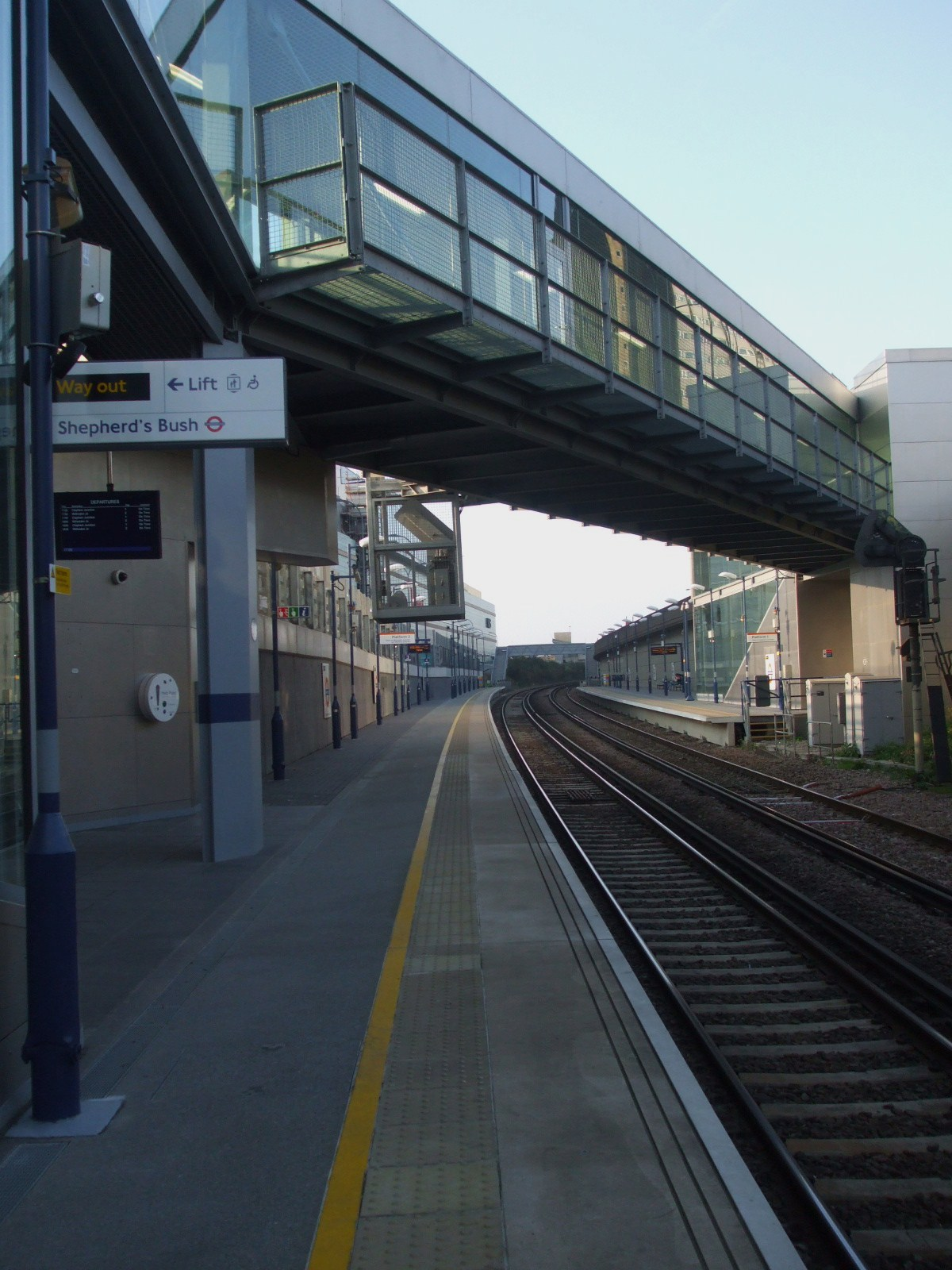
Footbridge looking north

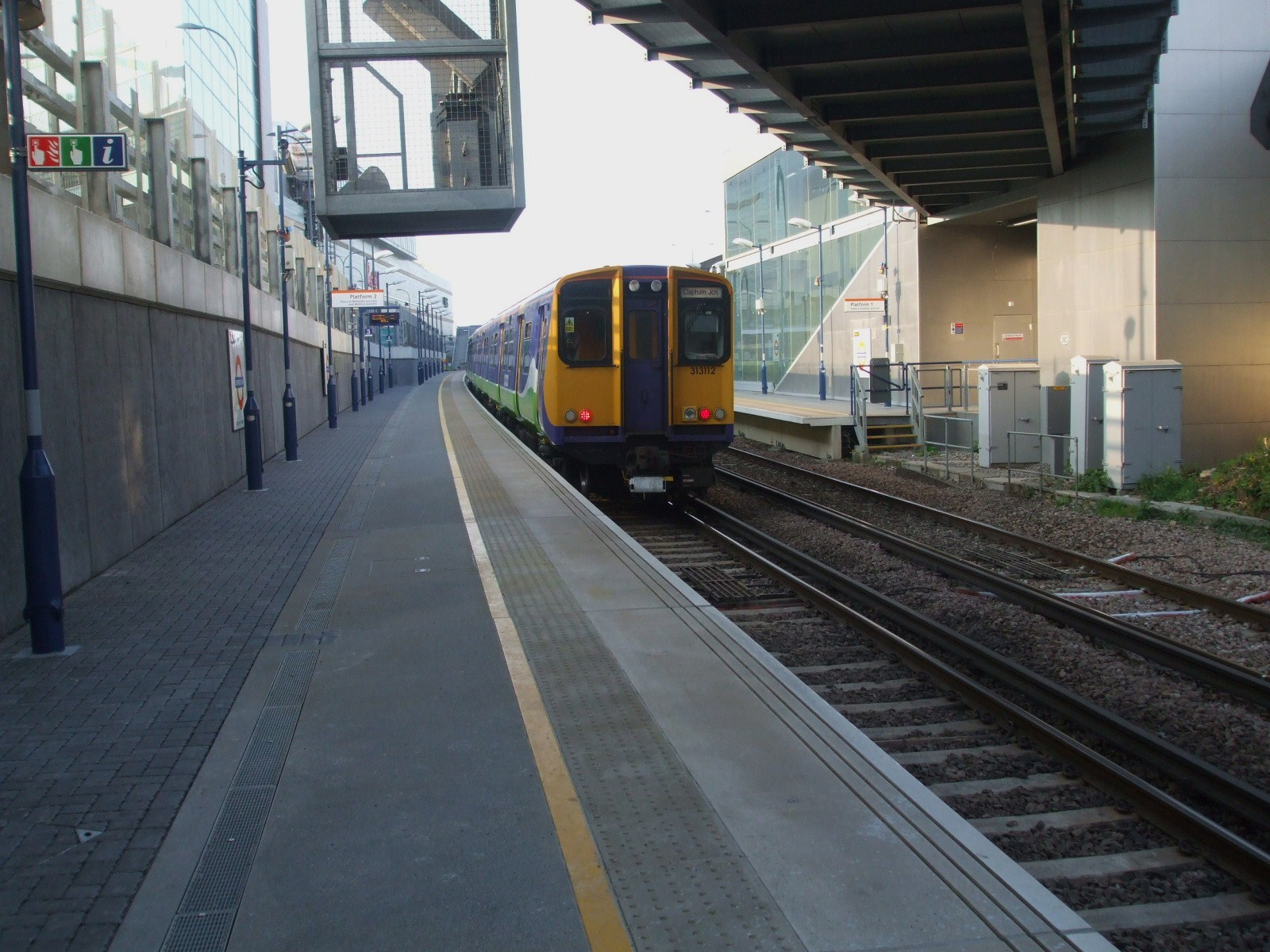
Class 313 unit departs with a northbound Overground service

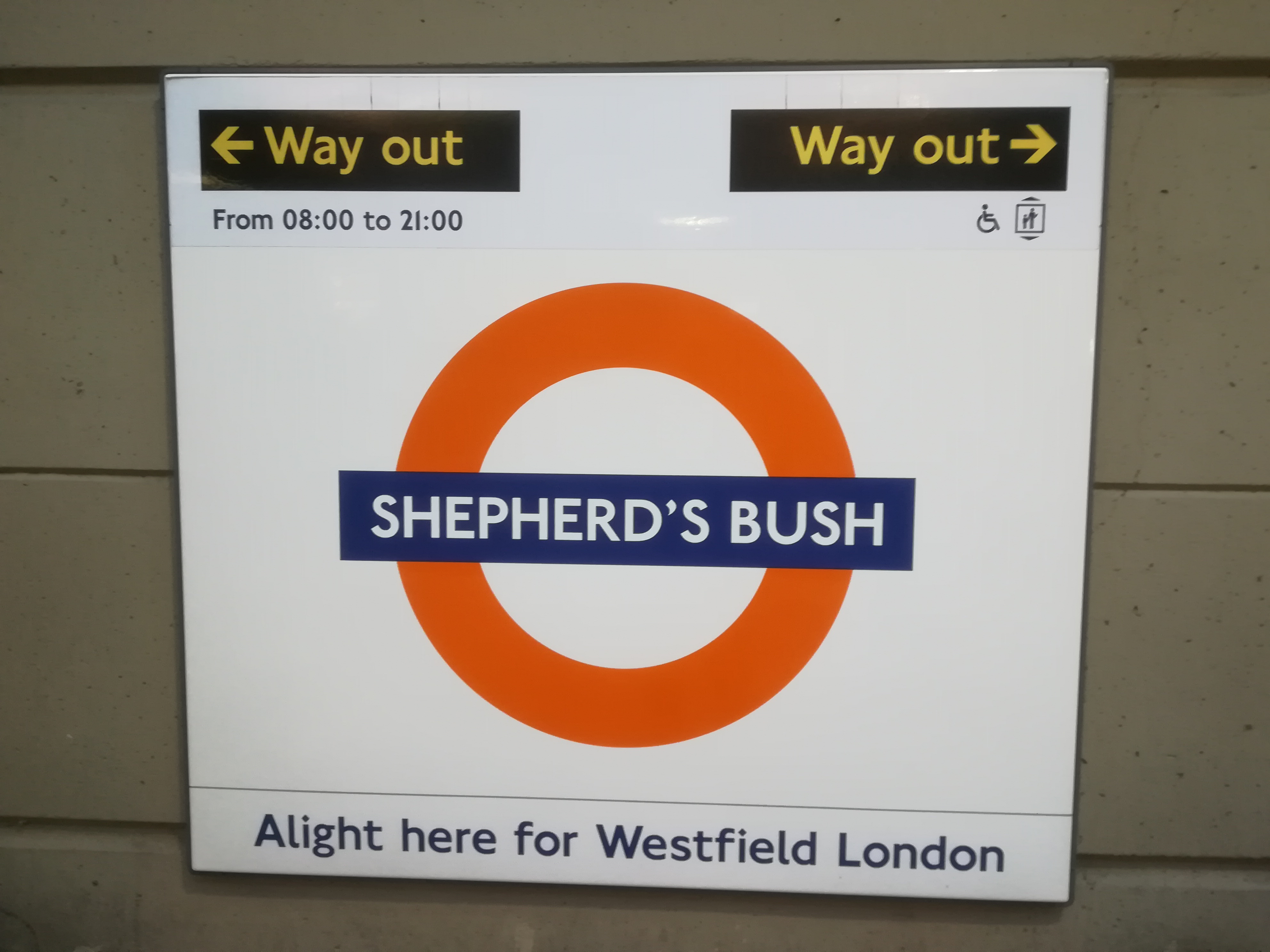
Platform roundel, based on the famous symbol of London Transport, but with Overground orange circle

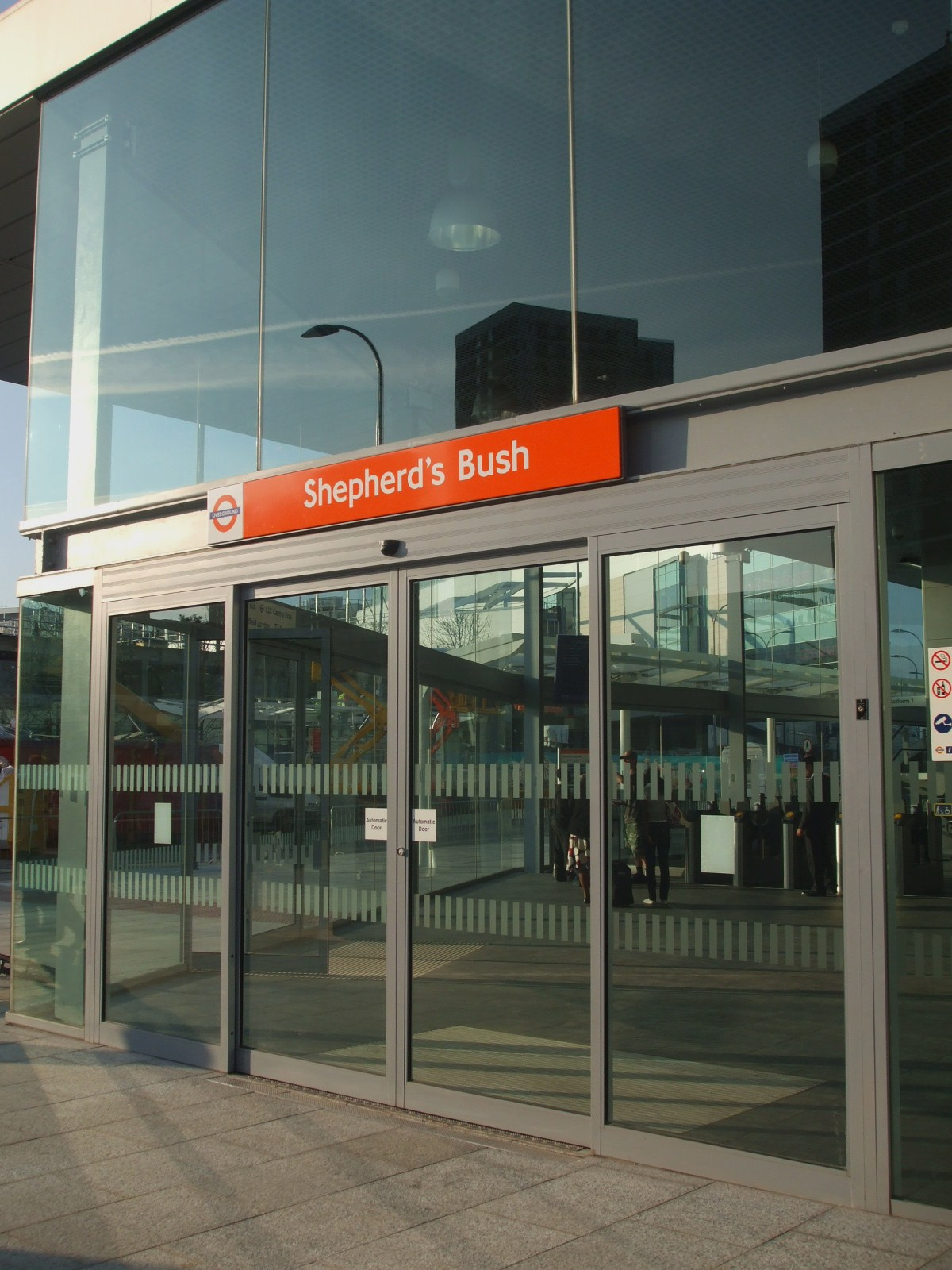
Station entrance viewed from the south

== See also ==
- Shepherd's Bush railway station (1874–1916) – a closed station of the same name south of Shepherd's Bush Common on a closed London and South Western Railway branch line
- Shepherd's Bush stations
- Imperial Wharf railway station – another newly opened station on the West London line
