= Middle Circle =

Railway line in London from 1872 to 1905

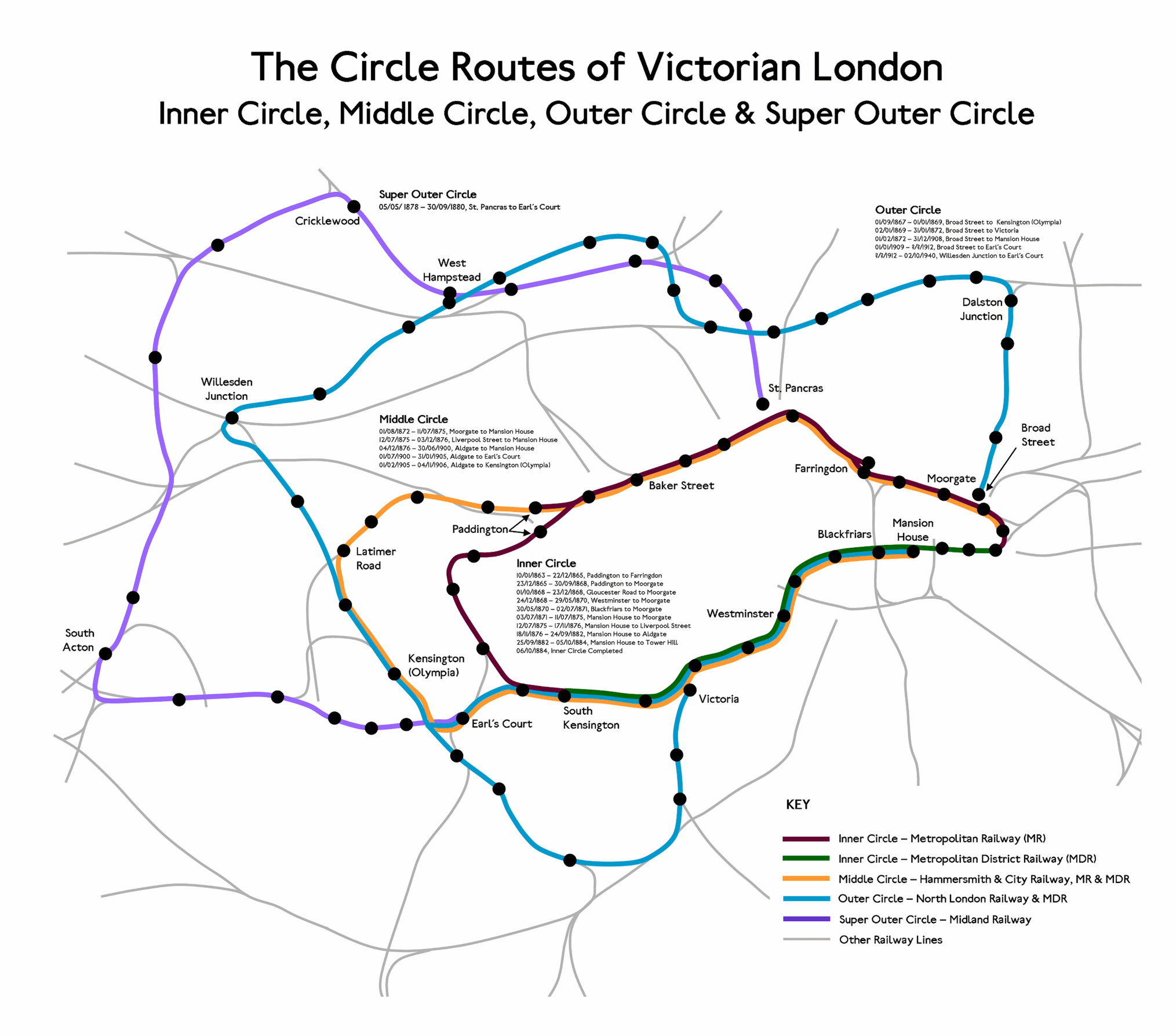
The Middle Circle (coloured gold) and other circular routes

The Middle Circle was a Great Western Railway service in London that operated from 1872 to 1905. The route was from the District Railway station at Mansion House to Earl's Court, then via the West London Railway to Latimer Road on to the Hammersmith & City Railway and then via the Metropolitan Railway to the City of London. Although not a complete circuit, it was one of several 'circle' routes around London that opened at the same time, such as the 'inner circle' that is today's Circle line. Trains would run once every 30 minutes. In 1900 the service was cut back to run from Earl's Court to Aldgate, and ended in 1905.

== History ==
=== Origins ===
The Great Western Railway (GWR) opened the Hammersmith & City Railway (H&CR) on 13 June 1864, and from 1 July 1864 carriages from Kensington (Addison Road) (now Kensington [Olympia]) were attached and detached from trains at Notting Hill; through services between Kensington and the City of London beginning in April 1865. A station had been built on the chord linking the H&CR and West London Railway, but this never opened due to GWR objections. Following an agreement between the Metropolitan Railway and GWR in August 1868, Uxbridge Road station, designed by the London & North Western Railway (L&NWR), opened on the West London Railway on 1 November 1869.

=== Middle Circle ===
The Middle Circle service started on 1 August 1872 when the GWR extended this service from Addison Road over the District Railway to Earl's Court and onto Mansion House. The GWR provided most of the locomotives and carriages for the service. (Note: Sources differ: Bruce 1983, p. 11 says that initially the District insisted that it provided the traction over its railway, so District and GWR locomotives were exchanged at Earl's Court, but Peacock 1970, p. 48 says that the GWR provided all the motive power. Both agree that some District carriages were used at the beginning.) When the Metropolitan extended the north side of its railway eastward from Moorgate, the Middle Circle followed suit and Bishopsgate (now Liverpool Street) became the terminus on 12 July 1875 and then Aldgate took the role from 4 December 1876. Trains ran once every 30 minutes.

From 1 July 1900, the service was cut back to run from Earl's Court to Aldgate, and the Middle Circle service ended on 31 January 1905.

=== Metropolitan Railway ===
From 1 February 1905 the service was temporarily replaced by a shuttle from Addison Road to Hammersmith & City stations, until 5 November 1906, when four electric trains an hour began running from Addison Road to Aldgate, one continuing to Whitechapel. This service appears on the 1908 'London Underground' map as a Metropolitan Railway service.

Passenger services on the West London Railway were ended on 19 October 1940 following bomb damage to the line, and the link between Latimer Road and the WLR closed. The curve was demolished in the 1960s to make way for the construction of the West Cross Route motorway.

With the exception of the Uxbridge Road, today the stations are served by the Circle, District and Hammersmith & City lines. Uxbridge Road station closed with the line in 1940 and Shepherd's Bush opened on the same site in 2008.

== List of stations ==
The following stations were served by the Middle Circle:

Station	Comments
Aldgate	After 4 December 1876.
Bishopsgate (now Liverpool Street)	After 12 July 1875
Moorgate Street (now Moorgate)	
Aldersgate Street (now Barbican)	
Farringdon Street (now Farringdon)	
King's Cross (now King's Cross St Pancras)	
Gower Street (now Euston Square)	
Portland Road (now Great Portland Street)	
Baker Street	
Edgware Road	
Paddington (Bishops Road) (now Paddington)	
Royal Oak	
Westbourne Park	
Notting Hill (now Ladbroke Grove)	
Latimer Road	
Uxbridge Road	Closed 1940. Shepherd's Bush station opened on the same site in 2008.
Addison Road (now Kensington (Olympia))	
Earl's Court	
Brompton (Gloucester Road) (now Gloucester Road)	Service withdrawn 1 July 1900
South Kensington	Service withdrawn 1 July 1900
Sloane Square	Service withdrawn 1 July 1900
Victoria	Service withdrawn 1 July 1900
St James's Park	Service withdrawn 1 July 1900
Westminster Bridge (now Westminster)	Service withdrawn 1 July 1900
Charing Cross (now Embankment)	Service withdrawn 1 July 1900
Temple	Service withdrawn 1 July 1900
Blackfriars	Service withdrawn 1 July 1900
Mansion House	Service withdrawn 1 July 1900

== Notes and references ==
=== Sources ===
- Bruce, J Graeme (1983). Steam to Silver. A history of London Transport Surface Rolling Stock. Capital Transport. ISBN 0-904711-45-5.
- Horne, Mike (2006). The District Line. Capital Transport. ISBN 1-85414-292-5.
- Jackson, Alan (1986). London's Metropolitan Railway. David & Charles. ISBN 0-7153-8839-8.
- Lee, Charles E. (1956). The Metropolitan District Railway. The Oakwood Press. ASIN B0000CJGHS.
- Peacock, Thomas B. (1970). Great Western London Suburban Services. Oakwood Press. ASIN B0006C7PD2.
