= Suburban electrification of the London, Midland and Scottish Railway =

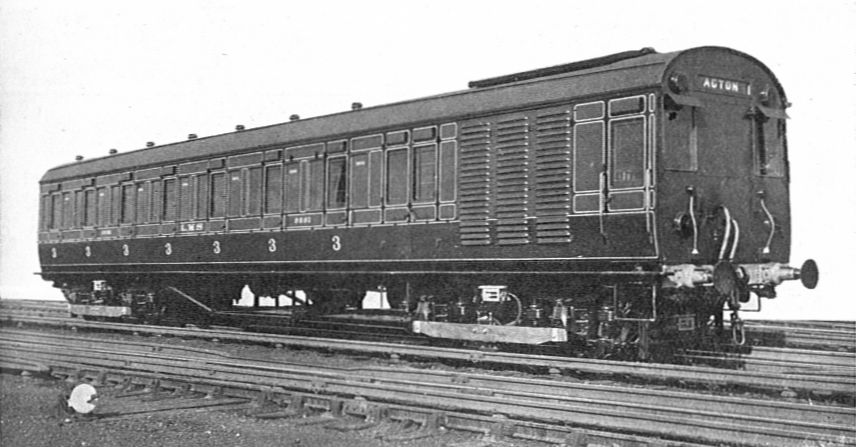
1927 compartment stock for the LNWR London lines

The London, Midland and Scottish Railway (LMS) was involved in the development of railway electrification of Britain. Like the LNER and the SR the LMS took over several schemes that had been developed by its constituent companies and also completed some of its own. All were suburban lines, in London, Liverpool and Manchester, and were usually steam lines converted to electric traction.

Each service is listed below, showing dates of opening and the railway responsible for its conversion.

== London District ==
Fourth rail, route length in 1927 was 40.2 miles (64.3 km).

- Whitechapel - Upminster, used by District Railway and opened in sections as follows:
  - 1905 Whitechapel - East Ham
  - 1908 East Ham - Barking
  - 1932 Barking - Upminster
- 1914 Willesden Junction - Earl's Court
- 1916 Broad Street - Kew Bridge - Richmond
- Euston / Broad Street - Watford Junction, opened in sections as follows:
  - 1917 Willesden Junction - Watford Junction: London and North Western Railway (L&NWR). Jointly operated by the LNWR and the Bakerloo line at its opening
  - 1922 Euston and Broad Street connected to the line; branch to Croxley Green (L&NWR)
  - 1927 Rickmansworth branch (LMS)

See also Watford DC Line, North London Line and West London Line

== Liverpool District ==
630 V DC third rail.

- Liverpool Exchange - Southport - Crossens and Ormskirk. Lancashire and Yorkshire Railway (L&YR)
  - 1904, April Liverpool - Southport
  - 1906 Liverpool - Aintree (two routes). The independent Liverpool Overhead Railway (opened 1893-1905 and the world's first overhead electric railway) was connected to this line by a spur line.
  - 1913 Aintree - Ormskirk
- 1938 Birkenhead Park - West Kirby and New Brighton: the Wirral Railway/Mersey Railway.

== Manchester District ==
- 1908 Lancaster - Morecambe - Heysham. 6.6 kV AC overhead. Midland Railway
- 1913 Bury - Holcombe Brook; 1916 extended to Manchester Victoria. Lancashire and Yorkshire Railway (L&YR). Third rail.
- 11 May 1931 Manchester, South Junction and Altrincham Railway. 1500 V DC overhead. Joint LMS/LNER

== See also ==
- British Rail Class 502
- British Rail Class 503
- LMS electric units
- LNWR electric units
- LYR electric units
- Railway electrification system
- List of railway electrification systems
- Railway electrification in Great Britain
