= LMS electric units =

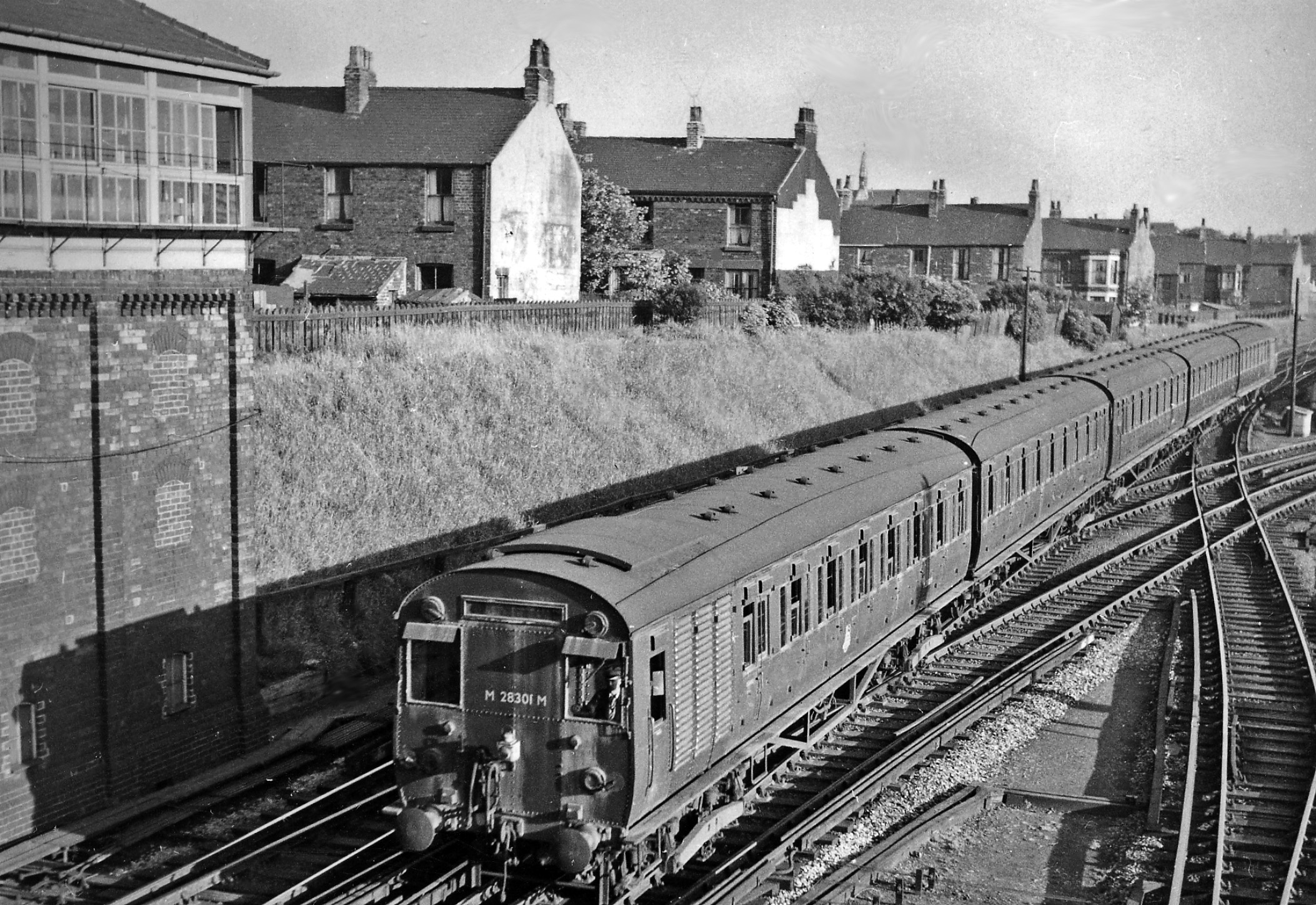
- LMS electric unit at Aintree, near Liverpool
- In service: 1926–1964
- Manufacturer: Metropolitan Carriage & Wagon Company; Clayton Wagon Company; Midland Railway Carriage and Wagon Company
- Replaced: Steam locomotives and carriages
- Constructed: 1926–1927; 1932
- Entered service: 1926
- Scrapped: 1963–1964
- Number built: 36 cars
- Number scrapped: All
- Formation: driving motor car + trailer + driving trailer
- Operators: London, Midland and Scottish Railway; British Railways

Specifications
- Power output: 4 x 265 hp (198 kW) traction motors
- Electric system(s): DC third and fourth rail

The LMS electric units were built in 1926–32 by the London, Midland and Scottish Railway (LMS) for use on the Liverpool to Ormskirk line and the DC lines in north London, all in England. Having inherited systems with DC electrification, the LMS built a number of new 3-car electric multiple units. The trains were withdrawn in 1963 and 1964.

== Life ==
In the 1923 grouping, the London, Midland and Scottish Railway (LMS) inherited several suburban railways with DC electrification, including systems in Liverpool and London. In 1926–27, the LMS received 28 driving motor thirds from the Metropolitan Carriage & Wagon Company, each with four 265 horsepower (198 kW) Metrovick motors, (Note: Marsden 2009, p. 85, when talking of their operation in the London area, rates the motors at 280 horsepower (210 kW).) 23 composite trailers from the Clayton Wagon Company, and driving trailer thirds from the Midland Railway Carriage and Wagon Company.

Similar to the earlier LNWR electric units but with accommodation in compartments (having seating for 40 in first class and 240 in third class)), eleven 3-car sets were sent for use on the Liverpool to Ormskirk line, alongside the earlier LYR electric units. The remainder were used on the Euston and Broad Street DC lines in north London. In 1932, additional cars were purchased to increase the London fleet to 25 three-car sets. These ran with the LNWR electric units and additional third class trailers that were marshalled in or between sets to increase train length to seven cars. The London-based units were withdrawn in 1963.

The Liverpool trains were reformed into three and two car units in 1939 to work with the new 5-car stock that became the British Rail Class 502, and a 2-car unit was subsequently converted for parcels use. The units were withdrawn in 1964.

== Notes and references ==
=== References ===
- Marsden, Colin J (30 January 2009). The DC Electrics. Casemate. ISBN 978-0-86093-615-2.
