= Railway carriage and wagon works =

Railway carriage and wagon works is the previously used British English term for a manufacturer of railway rolling stock. It could refer to one of the following:

- Birmingham Railway Carriage and Wagon Company
- Cravens Railway Carriage and Wagon Company
- Gloucester Railway Carriage and Wagon Company
- Lancaster Railway Carriage and Wagon Company
- Metropolitan Railway Carriage and Wagon Company
- Midland Railway Carriage and Wagon Company
- Oldbury Railway Carriage and Wagon Company
