= British Rail Class 504 =

1959 British Rail electric multiple unit

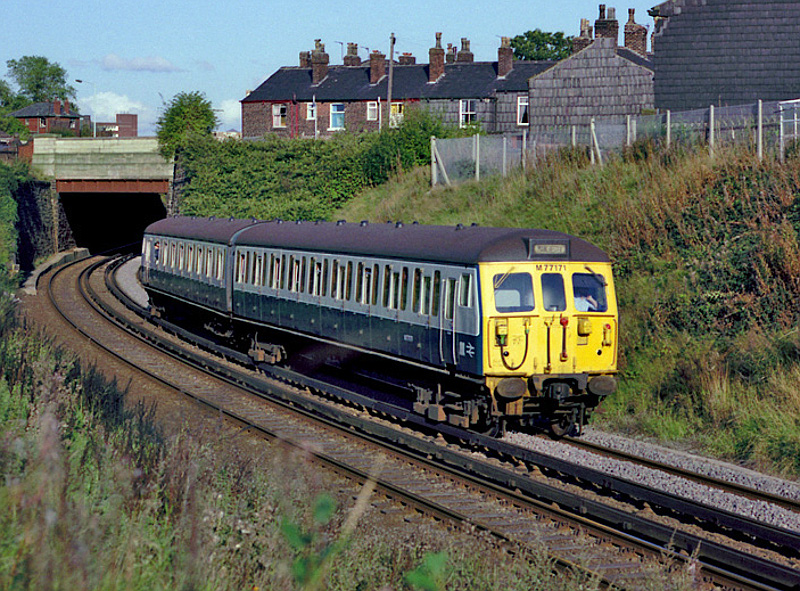
- A Class 504 in Bury in blue and grey livery in 1982.
- In service: 1959–1991
- Manufacturer: British Railways
- Order nos.: 30477 (DMBS); 30478 (DTC, as built)
- Built at: Wolverton Works
- Family name: 1959 EMU
- Replaced: LYR electric units
- Number built: 26 sets
- Number preserved: 1 set
- Number scrapped: 25 sets
- Formation: 2 cars per trainset DMBS+DTS
- Diagram: EB204 or BR407 (DMBS); EE215 or BR443 (DTS)
- Fleet numbers: M65436-M65461 (DMBS); M77157-M77182 (DTS)
- Capacity: 84S (DMBS); 94S (DTS)
- Operator: British Rail
- Depot: Bury
- Line served: Bury Line

Specifications
- Car body construction: Steel
- Train length: 133 ft 3 1/2 in (40.627 m)
- Car length: 64 ft 0 5/8 in (19.523 m) (over body)
- Width: 9 ft 0 in (2.74 m) (over body)
- Height: 12 ft 7 in (3.84 m) (over vents)
- Entry: 3 ft 9 in (1.14 m)
- Doors: Slam
- Articulated sections: 2
- Wheelbase: 46 ft 6 in (14.17 m) (bogie centres); 8 ft 9 in (2.67 m) (bogies)
- Maximum speed: 65 mph (105 km/h)
- Weight: 82 long tons (83 t; 92 short tons) (total); 49 long tons 8 cwt (50.2 t; 55.3 short tons) (DMBS); 32 long tons 9 cwt (33.0 t; 36.3 short tons) (DTS)
- Traction motors: Four English Electric
- Power output: 4 × 141 hp (105 kW); Total: 564 hp (421 kW)
- HVAC: Electric
- Electric system: 1,200 V DC side contact third rail
- Current collection: Contact shoe
- Bogies: Gresley
- Braking system: Air (EP/Auto)
- Coupling system: Buckeye (outer); Solid shank (inner)
- Multiple working: Within class only
- Headlight type: Tungsten
- Track gauge: 1,435 mm (4 ft 8 1/2 in) standard gauge

The British Rail Class 504 was a unique type of electric multiple unit that ran on 1,200 V DC third rail with side-contact current collection. All other mainline UK third rails have the electric "shoe" on top of the rail. The type was used only on the Bury Line between Manchester and Bury. They were built in 1959 at Wolverton Works, and the body was a standard type used for several electrification schemes of the time, but the high DC voltage through a side-contact third rail was unique in Britain. The trains replaced the previous five-car units built by the Lancashire and Yorkshire Railway (LYR) for the route, which had inaugurated this electrification scheme in 1916.

All were withdrawn in 1991 when the line was closed for conversion to form part of the Manchester Metrolink light rail system. One unit, No. 65451+77172, is preserved at the East Lancashire Railway.

== Numbering ==
British Railways numbers were:

- Motor Open Brake Second
  - M65436-M65461 (26 cars 1959, Wolverton Works)
- Driving Trailer Composite (later Driving Trailer Second)
  - M77157-M77182 (26 cars 1959, Wolverton Works)

For an explanation of terms, see British Rail coach type codes

== Incidents ==
All maintenance was conducted by the constructing workshops of Wolverton. The units were diesel hauled from Bury to and from Wolverton.

In 1986, a condemned vehicle (possibly 77169) was given (on temporary bogies) to the newly formed East Lancashire Railway (ELR). The carriage was used for a mock fire emergency exercise in Bury Tunnel (at Bolton Street station) with local fire services, British Rail Staff, and soon-to-be volunteers of the new ELR. After this exercise, the carriage was sold to a local scrap merchant in Bury and cut up early in 1987. The bogies were returned to the Bury EMU Depot. The bogies themselves were of interest, being a set of the original Lancashire and Yorkshire EMU unit bogies, which after the scrapping of LYR 1920s EMUs were retained to move objects around Bury Depot. These bogies were cut up into parts and dumped in a skip at Bury depot on its closure in 1991.

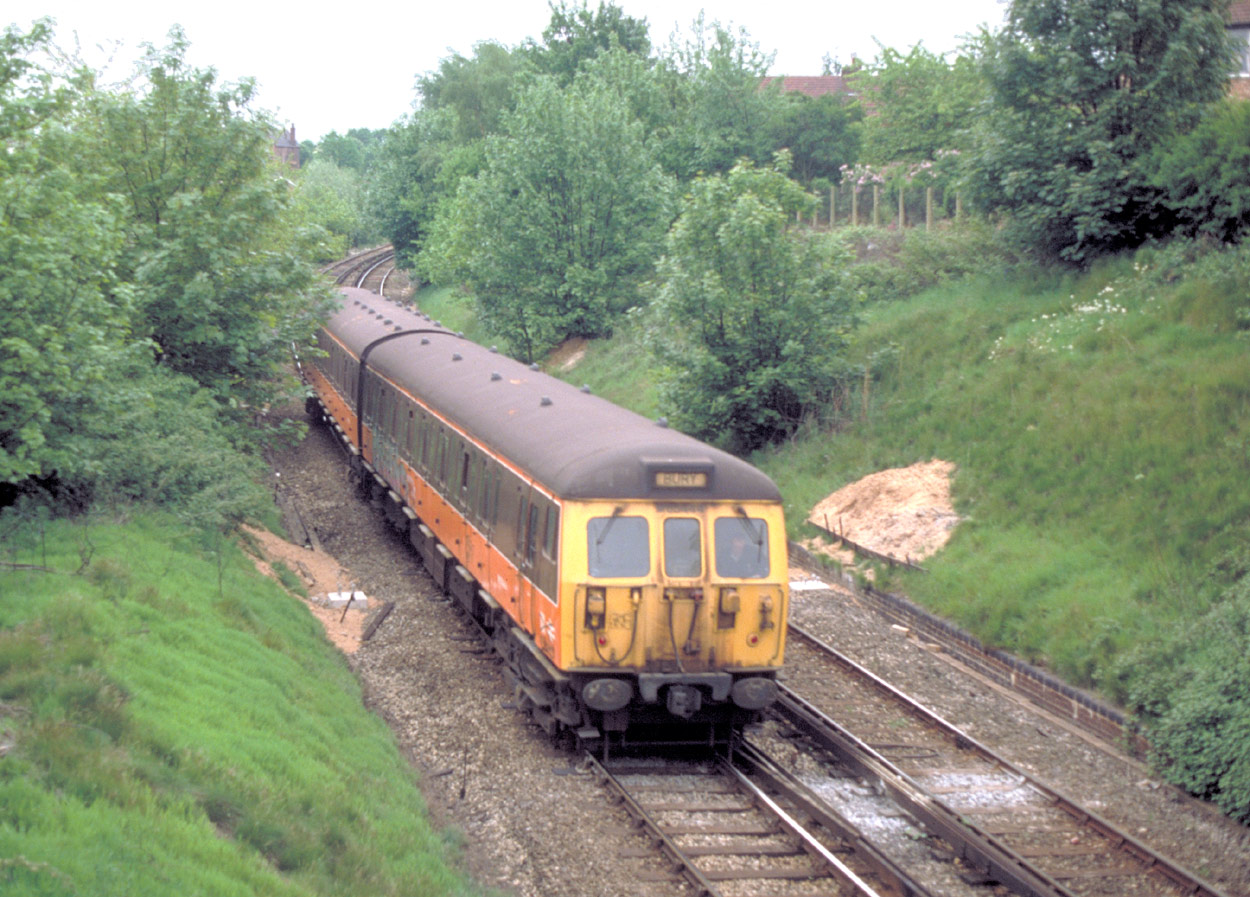
A northbound Class 504 train in northern Manchester shortly before closure for conversion to the Metrolink light rail system. The preparatory earthworks for Metrolink's overhead wire supports can be seen on both sides of the tracks.

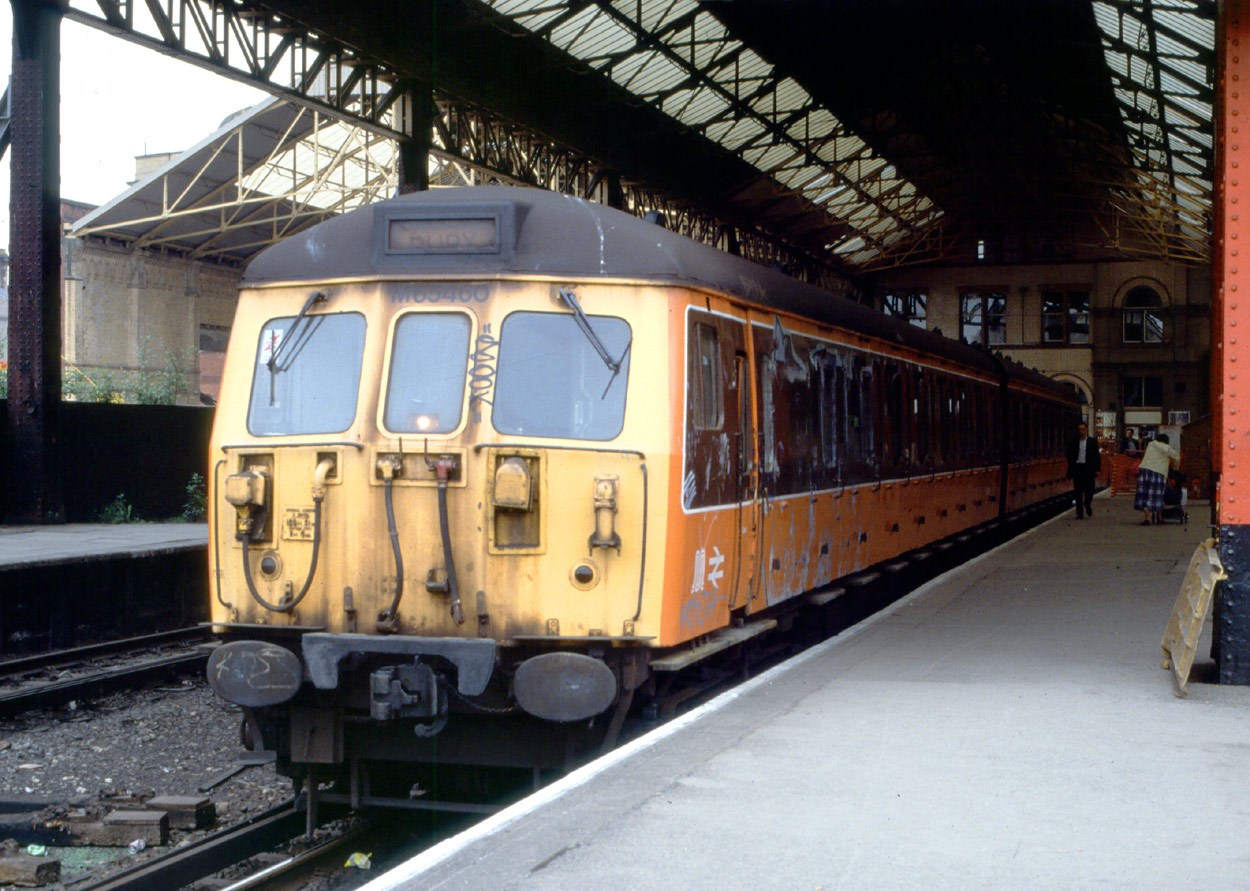
A Class 504 train at Manchester Victoria in GMPTE livery just weeks before withdrawal and replacement by the Metrolink light rail system.

== Withdrawal from service ==
Substantially more units were built than were soon required, and the unique electrical system prevented redeployment. By the 1966 LMR timetable, only 6 to 7 years after the units were introduced, the peak hour service was down to a 10-15 minute interval. This required only five 4-car trains in service, so only ten units from the fleet of 26 were required each day by this time. The reduced service (off peak was down to a 30-minute interval, requiring just two 2-car units) was responsible for much business being driven away to the frequent parallel bus services on this quite short urban route.

By the early 1970s, only 18 sets remained in use, reduction in demand on the service having led to years of storage for the first seven sets from the late 1960s onwards (65436-65442; 77157-77163). Additionally, Driving Trailer 77164 was transferred to the Tilbury lines of the Eastern Region 1970 to replace car 75292 in 302244, which had been written off in an accident. Its running mate 65443 was thereafter a spare car at Bury depot. 65436 and 65437 were used as the depot shunting set for a time, having had some front wiring and internal fittings removed, and were repainted in plain blue with yellow ends. The train was known locally for its speed and power over a normal power-trailer set.

Many of the early stored vehicles were still in BR Green with small yellow warning panels (inc 65438/439 and 77157-77160), with others in early versions of BR blue with; full yellow ends (inc 65436/437 - see above); wrap round yellow ends (65443); or even with small yellow warning panels (65442, 77162 and 77163).

In the late 1970s some cars, including 65439/443 and 77158/160, were stored at Croxley Green to supply spares to Class 501s. In February 1982, 65436/437 and 77157/158/163 were noted at Watford Junction as their Southern tour continued. Some finally went on to Wolverton Works (inc 77158) for further spares recovery.

After being stripped for spare parts at their southern locations, three cars (Blue 65436/443 and Green 77158) were dumped at Cockshute in Stoke-on-Trent in sight of the West Coast Main Line.

The eventual disposal of the early losses saw 65440 and 77161 scrapped at Bury in 1970/71; 65438 was sent to CF Booth in 1979; 65437 and 77157/163 disposed of at Horwich Works in 1982/83; 65439/441/442 and 77160/162 to Bird Group at Long Marston in 1983; finally 65436/443, together with the final green vehicle 77158, were sent to Vic Berry at Leicester for disposal in 1985. Of note was that despite the years of storage, none were officially withdrawn until just before disposal.

77164 retained its place in 302244 until 1985 when a replacement Class 302 driving trailer was located. The Class 504 vehicle was sent for scrap in June the same year to Marple and Gillott.

Apart from two vehicles, 65448 and 77169 withdrawn in the mid 1980s, no further significant withdrawals began until the closure of the line in the 1990s.

The first batch of latter day redundant Bury Class 504 units were hauled from Bury to Warrington before going to MC Metals of Glasgow for scrapping in early 1991. After this point the reduced Bury–Crumpsall service was operated in four-car formation. In August 1991, the entire line was closed. The next day a Class 31 diesel hauled all the units from Bury to Warrington in two trains of units. From Warrington, the entire collection was towed to MC Metals in Glasgow.

Two units remained at Bury, one purchased for the East Lancashire Railway, and another bought, reputedly as a joke, for £504 by Harry Needle Railroad Company. The latter was sold to the East Lancashire Railway Preservation Society (ELRPS). Much debate took place amongst ELR volunteers as the Class 31 pushed the units over the Buckley Wells crossing to a waiting Class 40. (The Bury Depot side of the crossing was still owned by BR until midnight that Saturday and the ELR was prevented from using its own locomotives to collect the units). From the Sunday after closure, the ELR moved over the crossing and took possession of the (BQ) Bury Depot Complex.

== Preservation ==
The ELR found itself with two unique Class 504 Units, having only expected one. One unit was refurbished in the late 1980s, with modern strip lighting, and complete running boards outside. The other unit was refurbished in the 1970s, and has incandescent bulbs and individual running boards to each door. The unit was eventually given to the ELRPS.

At the ELR annual diesel gala in October 1991, Harry Needle, with his then-owned Class 25 No. (25262), placed his locomotive in the centre of the two units. The units were through wired to have the diesel in the middle and the capability to be driven from both ends of the units in a push pull mode. This was a major success for the October diesel gala, and pointed numerous possibilities to the future for having two units. This weekend saw a Class 504 Unit running north of Bury station for the first time.

One unit has since been scrapped and the parts stored in a container at Buckley Wells. The remaining unit is still awaiting restoration, but as of November 2015 was in danger of being scrapped as well.

A new Class 504 preservation society was launched on 8 November 2015, and work on restoring the units began on 24 January 2016.

Besides the Class 504 at the ELR, an example of the unique side contact third rail gear and a section of electric rail was retained for the National Railway Museum at York; this is now restored and on display.

== See also ==
- British Rail Class 304 - an AC electric multiple unit externally similar to Class 504
