= Bury EMU Depot =

Disused railway maintenance depot in Bury, Greater Manchester

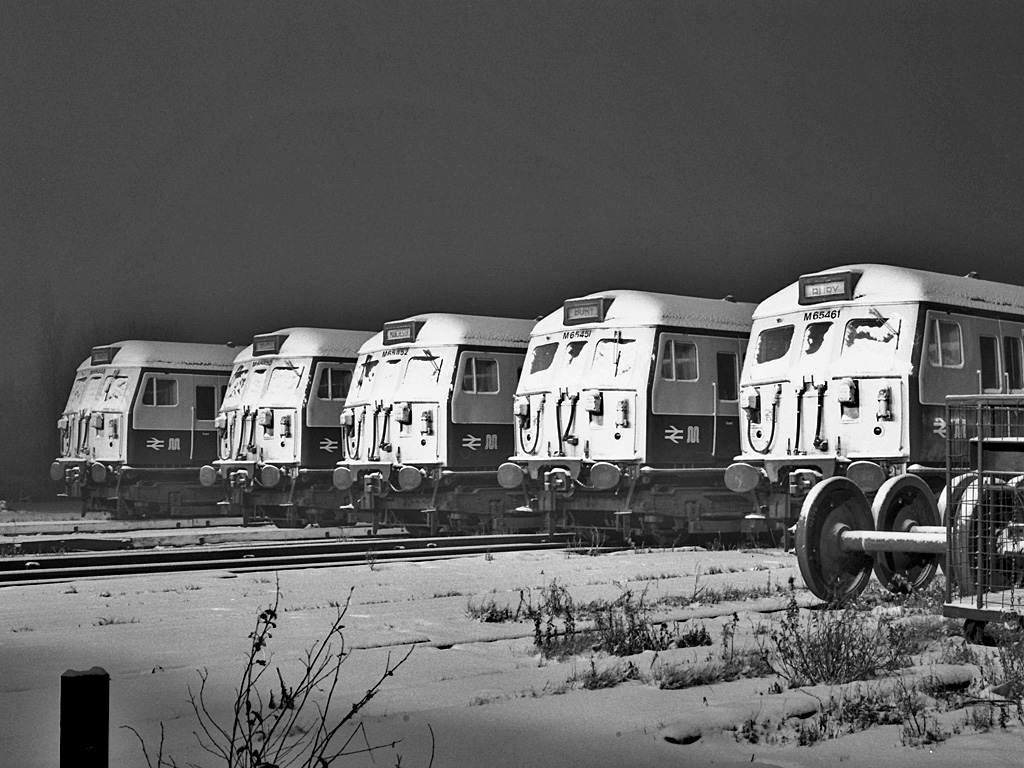
- Class 504s outside the depot, in 1983.
- Interactive map of Bury EMU Depot

Location
- Location: Bury, England
- Coordinates: 53.5875°N 2.3042°W
- OS grid: SD799102

Characteristics
- Owner: British Rail
- Depot code: BQ (1975-)
- Type: EMU

History
- Closed: 1965 (reopened 1973)
- BR region: London Midland
- Former depot code: 26D (1875-1963); 9M (1963-1965); BV (1973-1975)
- Former rolling stock: Class 504

Bury EMU Depot was an Electric Traction Depot located in Bury, England. The depot was located on the west side of the line to the south of Bury railway station.

The depot code was BQ.

== History ==
Originally a steam facility known as Buckley Wells depot, it was closed between 1965 and 1973. By 1983, Class 504 EMUs had been allocated to the depot. The depot is now used by the East Lancashire Railway.

== Bibliography ==
- Anon. (1983). British Rail Locoshed Book (Spring 1983 ed.). Ian Allan. ISBN 0711012954.
- Webster, Neil; Greengrass, Robert; Greaves, Simon (1987). British Rail Depot Directory. Metro Enterprises Ltd. ISBN 9780947773076. OCLC 20420397.
