= LNWR electric units =

Classes of English electric trains

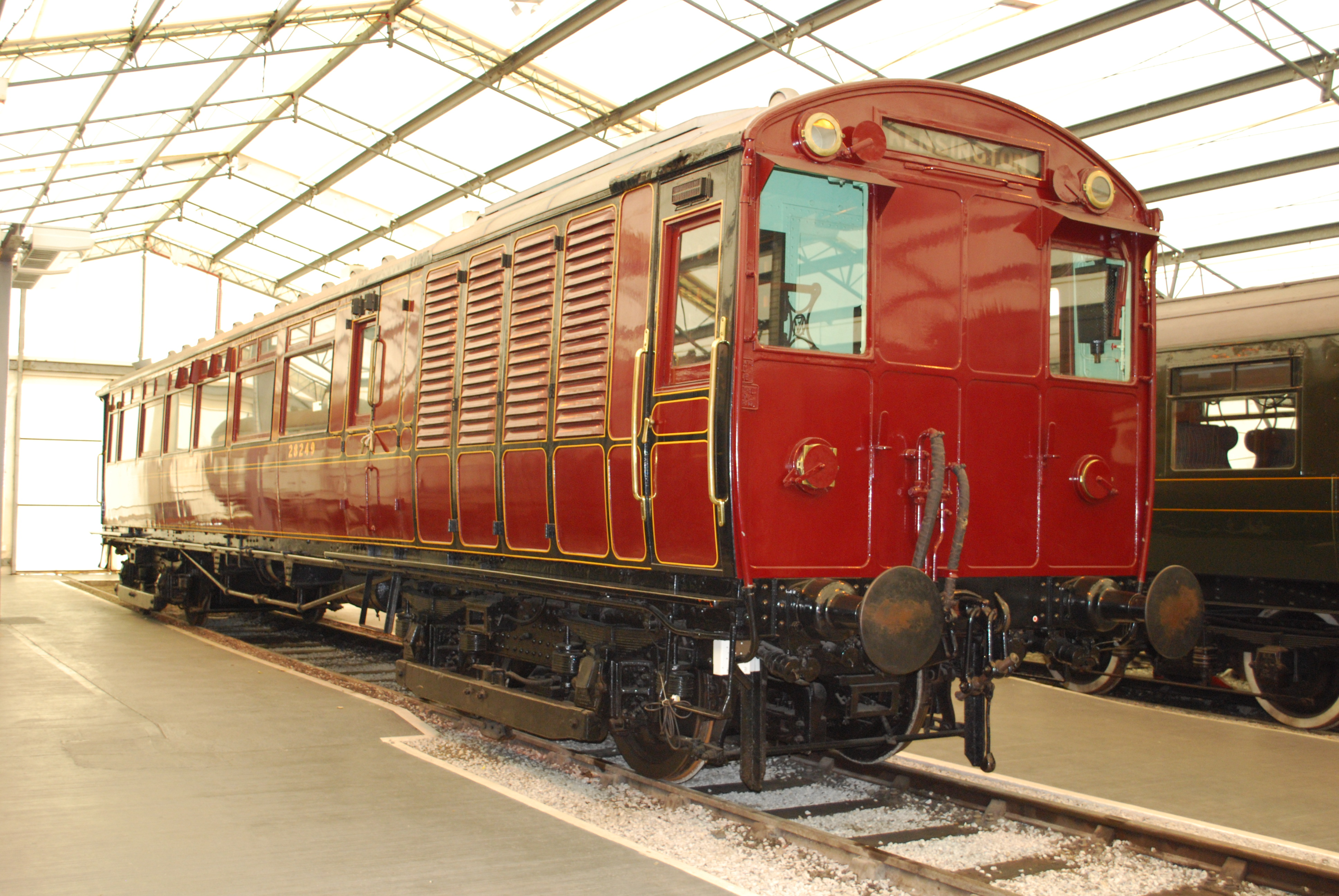
- LNWR EMU Motor Car at National Railway Museum, York
- In service: 1914–1960
- Manufacturer: Metropolitan Cammell
- Formation: Motor car + trailer + driving trailer
- Operators: London & North Western Railway, London, Midland and Scottish Railway, British Railways

Specifications
- Traction system: Siemens: Four 250 hp (186 kW) traction motors Oerlikon: Four 280 hp (209 kW) traction motors
- Electric system: 630 V DC
- Current collection: Third and fourth rail
- Track gauge: 4 ft 8 1/2 in (1,435 mm)

The LNWR electric units were ordered by the London and North Western Railway for its suburban services in London. The first cars, made with Siemens equipment, arrived in 1914, and these were followed by two larger batches of units with Oerlikon equipment. The trains were formed into 3-car units, with first and third class accommodation in open saloons. Following the 1923 grouping and absorption of the line into the London, Midland and Scottish Railway (LMS), similar LMS electric units, but with accommodation in compartments, were purchased to run with the Oerlikon units in 1926 and 1932. The trains were all withdrawn by 1960.

== Service introduction ==
The London and North Western Railway's inner-suburban network encompassed the lines from London Broad Street to Richmond and London Euston to Watford and branch lines such as Watford to Croxley Green. With links to the District Railway at Earl's Court and over the route to Richmond, and the Bakerloo line being extended over the Watford DC lines, the railway was electrified with 630 V DC fourth rails. The electricity was generated at the LNWR's power station in Stonebridge Park and a depot built at Croxley Green.

The first four electric multiple units used Siemens electrical equipment and were composed of a driving trailer third, composite trailer and driving motor third with four 250 horsepower (190 kW) traction motors. The trains seated 38 first and 138 third class passengers in open saloons. These entered service on the West London Line route between Willesden and Earl's Court in November 1914, although the LNWR had been operating services since May using stock borrowed from the District Railway.

== Oerlikon units ==
The second batch of trains, 38 three-car sets and 5 spare motor cars, used Swiss Oerlikon equipment and was generally similar to the Siemens powered stock. The four traction motors were rated at 260 horsepower (190 kW) and these trains seated 33 first and 130 third class passengers. The third class accommodation was a mixture of longitudinal seating and seats arranged in facing bays in pairs on either side of the gangway. The first class accommodation (downgraded to third class at the beginning of the Second World War), occupied two of the three saloons into which the intermediate car was divided, one being for smokers and the centre saloon for non-smokers. The saloons were separated by swing doors with frosted glass or bevelled plain glass glazing, the latter having an etched LNWR script decorative monogram. The first class seating was in facing pairs arranged 2+1 on either side of the gangway, and the general ambience was Edwardian-luxurious, with mahogany panelling. Above the seats were glazed frames which displayed photographs of landscapes and towns served by the London and North Western Railway; these were retained to the end.

Glazing consisted of large fixed lights with two small outward-opening lights above a transom; some were top-hinged and others side-hinged to provide alternative ventilation. Entrance doors were single-leaf sliding, and hand operated.

For operation on the extension of the Bakerloo line, the LNWR and the London Electric Railway (LER) ordered new Watford Joint Stock, but were delayed by World War I, not arriving until 1920. The electrification of the line to Euston was completed in 1922 and a further 75 three-car Oerlikon units and 3 spare motor cars were received.

After the 1923 grouping, the LNWR became part of the London, Midland and Scottish Railway (LMS). In 1926 and 1932, further 3-car LMS electric units, similar to the LNWR electric units but with compartments, arrived to strengthen the London fleet.

== Numbering ==
The LMS numbers of the Siemens stock were:

- DMBT, 28219–28222

The LMS numbers of the Oerlikon stock were:

- DMBT, 28000, 28223–28299 (28236 is missing from the list in the source)

== Operation ==
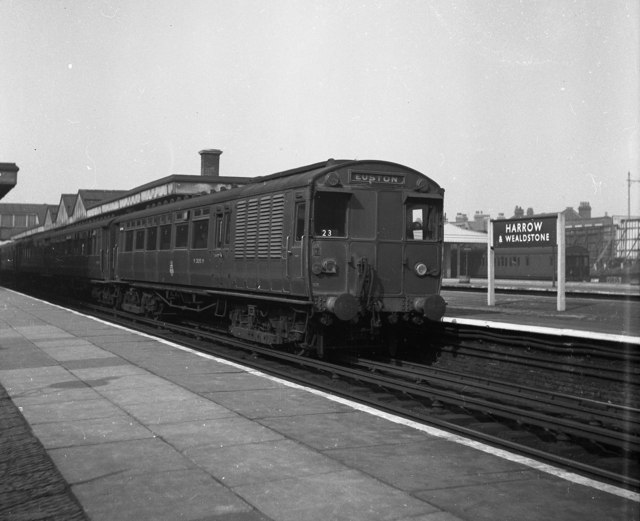
Oerlikon electric train at Harrow and Wealdstone, 1956

The LNWR electric lines built up to a substantial operation, at its peak in the 1930s-50s period, and then ran into a major decline. The two basic main services were Euston to Watford Junction, and Broad Street to Richmond, the latter passing over the former at Willesden Junction station. In addition there was a substantial operation of Broad Street to Watford Junction trains via Primrose Hill, which shared significant sections of both main routes. There were lesser branches from Willesden Junction to Earls Court (closed during WWII), Watford to Rickmansworth (closed in 1952) and Watford to Croxley Green (closed in 1990). The Earls Court route was the normal operation for the four pioneer Siemens-equipped trains.

In an early 1950s timetable, there were substantial peak period electric services on the main routes. Departing between 5 pm and 6 pm there were four trains in the hour on Broad Street to Richmond (the "North London line"), five in the hour on Euston to Watford (the "DC line"), and seven in the hour on Broad Street to Watford. All these were scheduled for 6-car trains. A small number of the peak hour Watford line trains were operated at the northern end directly to Croxley Green instead of to Watford Junction. In addition certain trains from the Bakerloo Line of the Underground ran over the line from Queens Park to Harrow & Wealdstone or Watford Junction. The services were not on a particularly regular interval basis as there was the need for them to interleave with many other operations, and each other; in addition, some trains were on a semi-fast basis, or skipped certain stations. The Croxley and Rickmansworth lines were normally operated by 3-car shuttle trains. The pre-war Earls Court trains had been similar.

The combined frequency of the electric trains from South Hampstead to Watford was thus about every five minutes, and the through Bakerloo trains were additional to this. This very substantial operation (compared to later years) was behind the installation of the pioneer automated signalling system in 1933, which lasted until 1988 when replaced by a conventional system, by which time services were substantially reduced. The 1933 signalling system had allowed scheduled headways of two minutes on the route.

== Liveries ==
The units carried three liveries during their life. They entered service in the LNWR "plum and spilt milk" livery. During the LMS period, they operated in crimson livery fully lined-out to represent timber panelling. On nationalisation, over a period of about three years, they received Southern Green livery with the BR "cycling lion" emblem half-way along the lower side of the motor coaches and retained this until withdrawal.

== Rebuilding ==
At least two motor coaches, M28247M and M28282M, were rebuilt with flush panels and windows with large radius curves to the lower corners, giving them a more modern appearance. The reason for this is unknown, but it may have been a war-damage repair.

== Withdrawal ==
The Watford Joint Stock was replaced on Bakerloo line services in 1930–31, with the LMS retaining three sets for use on branch lines until 1946. The Siemens stock trains were stored after the withdrawal of passenger services over the West London Railway following bomb damage in 1940. In 1952, three sets and subsequently a fourth set were converted to prototype 25 kV AC overhead EMUs (Class AM1) and ran on the Lancaster-Morecambe-Heysham line until 1966. The actual overhead line voltage was 6.6kV this being the line voltage of the line when its was first electrified but at 25Hz. This involved adding a transformer and mercury arc rectifiers to the old motor coaches which was undertaken at Wolverton works with equipment from English Electric.

The Oerlikon stock trains were replaced between 1957 and 1960 by Class 501 units, and a motor car, DMBT No. 28249, is currently exhibited at the National Railway Museum, York. The LMS electric units were withdrawn in 1963.

== Sources ==
- Marsden, Colin J (30 January 2009). The DC Electrics. Casemate. ISBN 978-0-86093-615-2.
- Ian Allan ABC of Southern and LMS Electrics, 1945 edition, page 33
- Ian Allan ABC of British Railways Locomotives, winter 1962/3 edition, page 324
