= LYR electric units =

Type of English railway stock

The Lancashire and Yorkshire Railway (LYR) built suburban electric stock for lines in Liverpool and Manchester. The line between Liverpool to Southport began using electric multiple units (EMUs) on 22 March 1904, using a third rail 625 V DC. Additional trains were later built for this route, and in 1913 incompatible stock for the route to Ormskirk. Lightweight units were built to run on the Liverpool Overhead Railway.

The Southport units were replaced in the early 1940s; after regular through services onto the LOR were withdrawn the lightweight units were used on local Crossens services until 1945; the Ormskirk units were withdrawn in 1964.

In 1913, an experimental 3.5 kV DC overhead line system operated between Bury and Holcombe Brook in the Manchester area, and 1.2 kV DC with a side-contact third rail between Manchester Victoria and Bury. Electric services started in 1916, the Bury to Holcombe Brook route being converted in 1918. The cars were replaced in 1959/60.

== Liverpool ==
=== Liverpool to Southport ===
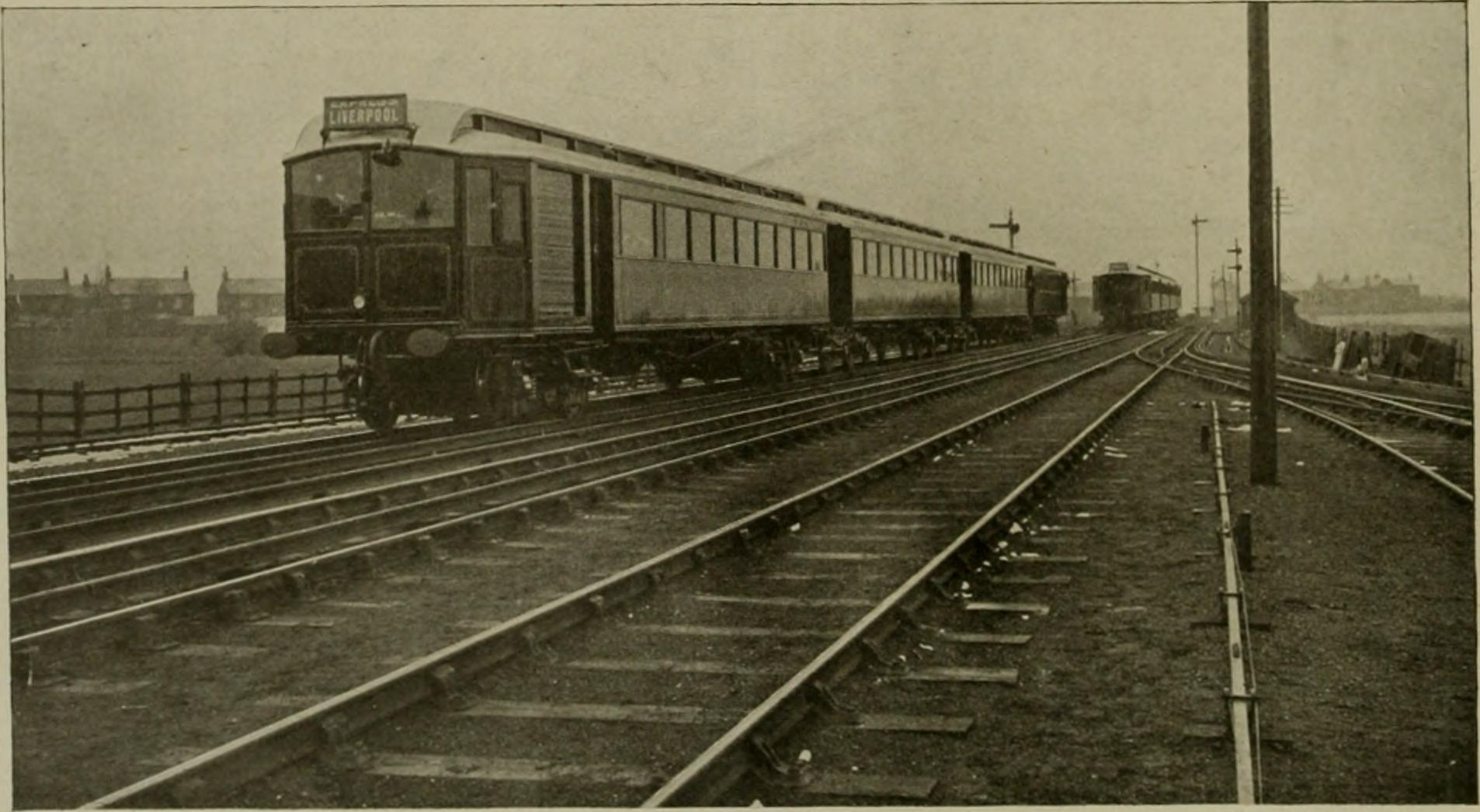

Electrification of the Southport route was begun in 1902. It was increasingly popular for commuting and pleasure trips, but suffered from competition from the Cheshire Lines Railway. Electric traction was seen as cleaner than steam locomotives, and with coal prices rising, potentially cheaper. At the time, concerns were being expressed, especially in the railway press, that engineering developments in Britain was being overtaken by electrification projects in America and Switzerland. Preston-based Dick, Kerr and Company was responsible for the traction systems and the L&YR built the rolling stock. A 625 V DC four-rail system was adopted. A live rail was outside the running rails 3 ft 11 1/2 in (1.207 m) from the centre of the track and 3 in (76 mm) above the top of the running rails. A return rail, cross-bonded to the running rails, was positioned centrally between the tracks. The route was 23 1/2 miles (37.8 km) long and gaps were left at 46 level crossings. The L&YR built a power station at Formby, generating 7.5 kV AC, conveyed to four sub-stations by underground cables.

The first batch of trains were open saloons 60 ft (18 m) long and 10 ft (3.0 m) wide, initially in four-car sets. The two driving motor cars were third class, weighed 46 long tons (46.7 t; 51.5 short tons) powered by four 150 hp (110 kW) motors. The traction current was controlled from driving cabs at both ends of the train. The two trailers were first class or third class and weighed 20 long tons (20.3 t; 22.4 short tons). Doors were provided at the ends of the cars and electric lighting was installed. The trains had an automatic vacuum brake. The line between Liverpool Exchange and Southport opened on 22 March 1904. Seven trains an hour left Liverpool, one express and three stopping trains to Southport, and three terminating at Hall Road. Electrification meant the journey time of stopping trains to Southport was reduced from 54 to 37 minutes. In 1905–6 a further eight motor coaches, six first-class trailers and six third-class trailers were built to slightly different design, followed by six more 65 feet 7 inches (20 m) long motor coaches in 1910. To cope with the heavy traffic to the Grand National at Aintree, three trains of ten coaches were converted to allow them to be marshalled between the Southport direct-control motor coaches. The LY&R stock began to be replaced by new stock in 1940, which became the British Rail Class 502 and all LYR examples had been withdrawn by 1942.

=== Liverpool to Ormskirk ===
The line to Ormskirk was electrified in stages, reaching Ormskirk in 1913, with different, incompatible EMUs. Initially, 12 third-class motor coaches with gangways on their outer ends and six third-class trailers were built, followed in 1910–14 by seven first-class and 23 third-class trailers, four driving trailer thirds, and eight motor coaches with 250 horsepower (190 kW) motors. After the 1923 grouping the line was part of the London, Midland and Scottish Railway (LMS), and in 1926–27, eleven LMS electric units were built for the Ormskirk route, not withdrawn until 1964.

=== Liverpool Overhead Railway ===
Connections were built with the Liverpool Overhead Railway (LOR) at Seaforth & Litherland to a new station beside LOR's Seaforth Sands station and from the North Mersey Branch route to Aintree. From 2 July 1905, LOR trains began to run through to Seaforth & Litherland. In 1906 the L&YR electrified the line to Aintree. The L&YR built special lightweight EMUs and from 1906 began running services over the LOR from Dingle to Southport and Aintree. Regular services to Aintree were withdrawn in 1908, and after this special trains ran only twice a year, on Jump Sunday and the following Friday for the Grand National at Aintree Racecourse. Through services from Dingle to Southport were withdrawn in 1914, passengers changing at Seaforth & Litherland. The trains were used on Crossens local services to Southport until 1945.

=== Electric locomotive ===
An experimental electric locomotive (rebuilt from a 2-4-2 steam locomotive) was introduced in 1912 for goods traffic and earned the nickname Beetle. This had four 150 horsepower (110 kW) motors and could pick up current from the third rail on the main line or from overhead wires in Aintree and North Mersey yards. It was withdrawn and scrapped around 1919/20.

== Manchester ==
=== Holcombe Brook ===
From 1913, an experimental electric service operated between Bury and Holcombe Brook. The equipment was provided by Dick, Kerr & Co. of Preston, which was developing its products for overseas sales. It used was 3.5 kV DC overhead, and four cars, two driving motor brake thirds and two driving trailer thirds, were built at the LYR's Newton Heath works. The motor cars had two motors, one 150 horsepower (110 kW) and the other 250 horsepower (190 kW), and seated 75 passengers. The trailers seated 85 passengers. In 1918 the line was converted to the 1.2 kV DC system chosen for the Bury line and the cars stored before being converted into an experimental 4-car diesel-electric unit in 1927.

=== Manchester to Bury ===
LYR electric units (Manchester)
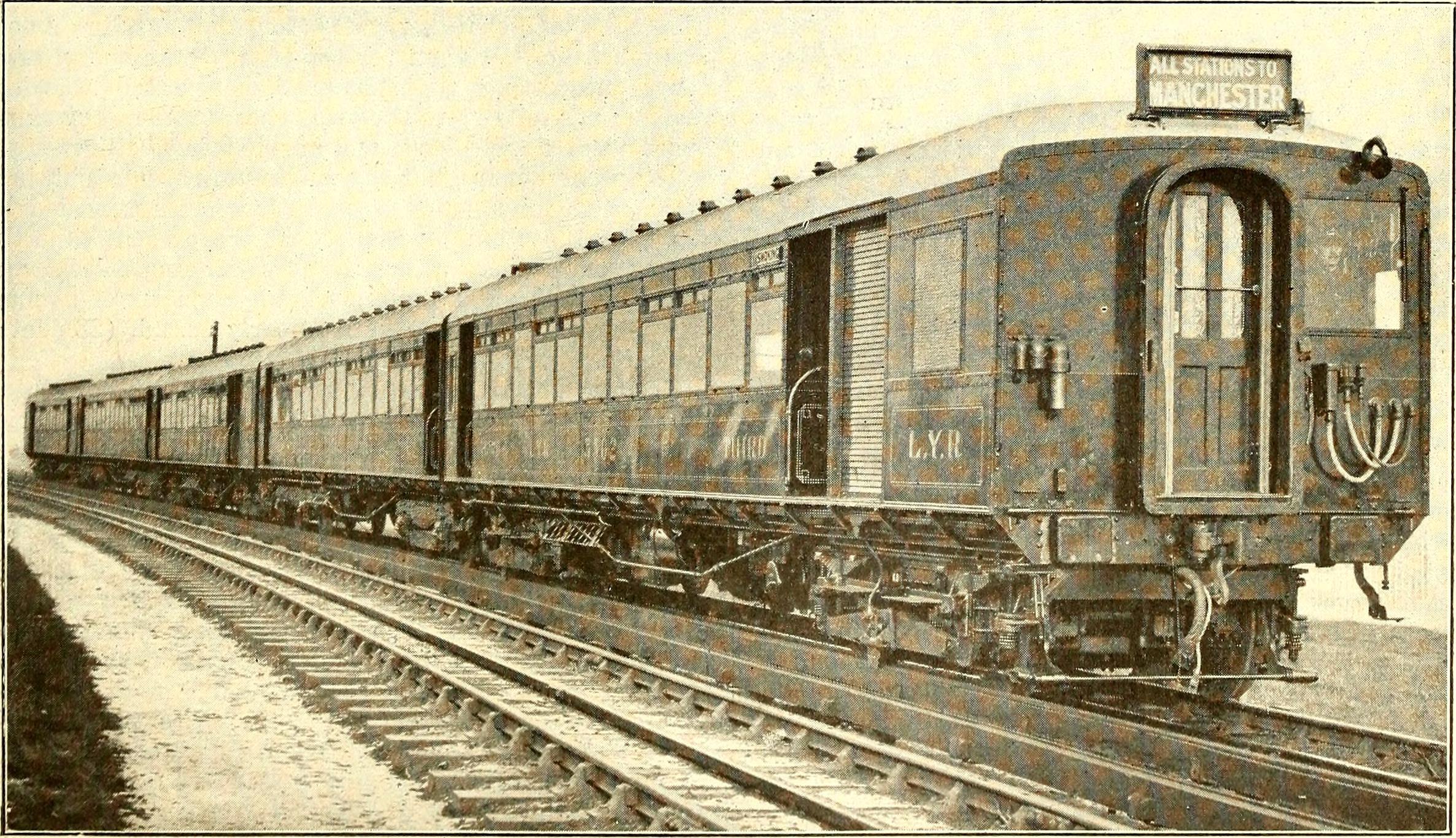
- In service: 1916–1960
- Manufacturers: Lancashire & Yorkshire Railway
- Number built: 38 motor cars, 28 trailers
- Formation: variable: 2, 3, 4 or 5 cars
- Operator: Lancashire & Yorkshire Railway

Specifications
- Weight: 54 long tons (60.5 short tons; 54.9 t) (DMBT); 29 long tons (32.5 short tons; 29.5 t) (TF/TT)
- Electric system: 1.2 kV DC
- Current collection: Third rail (side contact)
- Track gauge: 4 ft 8 1/2 in (1,435 mm)

After the Holcombe Brook service, the LYR decided to electrify the Manchester Victoria to Bury line using 1,200 V DC side-contact third rail, and originally a fourth rail was bonded to the running rails. The purpose of this unique third rail arrangement was to prevent the service being affected by ice forming on the live rail. Sixty-six cars were built at Newton Heath works, the electrical equipment having been supplied by Dick, Kerr & Co. The cars were 63 feet 7 inches (19.38 m) long, the driving motor cars weighing 54 long tons (60.5 short tons; 54.9 t) and the trailer cars 29 long tons (32.5 short tons; 29.5 t). The stock was of all-metal construction, with steel framework and aluminium panelling for the sides and roof; the third class trailers seated 95 passengers, the motor cars 74 and the first class trailers 72. The trains were fitted with vacuum brakes.

The interiors of the cars were of open saloon design, with fixed and reversible seats – except in the first class carriage, where all seats were reversible. Doors were provided at the ends of the carriages; an unusual feature, though previously used on the original Liverpool-Southport trains, was that the doors were fitted inside an alcove so that they opened within the width of the train. The exits were fitted with particularly convenient handrails.

Although the Manchester Victoria to Bury line is less than 11 miles (18 km) long, the trains had through corridor connections from end to end. Passengers were not provided with any means of stopping the train in an emergency, but could at least move into an adjacent carriage. Large emergency windows were provided, hinged at the top and opening outwards, a feature which the trains seem to have shared with the "fireproof" train developed by the LYR in 1914. There was no emergency lighting. The trains carried an oil lamp front and rear: the lamp at the front was in the centre when the train was carrying passengers and on the nearside of the buffer beam when it was working empty.

An electric bell system was provided for communication between guard and driver. There was a bell-push (operated by a key) at every door – a particularly convenient feature on the Bury to Holcombe Brook line, on which the guard, perhaps rather unusually in that era, collected the fares from passengers boarding at intermediate stations.

The trains are sometimes described as electrical multiple units (EMU's), but this, in the normal sense of the term, is inaccurate. Each car was individually coupled to its neighbours, and the full line voltage (1.2 kV) passed the full length of the train. There was a driving cab at both ends of every car, including the trailers. This gave exceptional versatility in the formation of trains, which could range from two to five cars. The specified formations (all motor cars were 3rd class) were:

- Two-car: Motor and first-class trailer
- Three-car: Motor, first-class trailer and motor
- Four-car: Motor, first-class trailer, motor and third-class trailer
- Five-car: Motor, first-class trailer, motor, third-class trailer and motor

In practice, three-car trains were used on the Bury to Holcombe Brook line and, normally, five-car trains on the Manchester to Bury line – though from the mid-1950s onward 4-car trains, usually missing a motor car, were not uncommon. (These trains, though not necessarily in the precise formation shown above, would therefore frequently have a trailer leading.) It is doubtful if a two-car set, as specified, would have been viable: only the motor cars had current collectors, and a single motor car would almost certainly have failed to straddle the gaps in the live rail made necessary by the pointwork outside Victoria.

Controllers were normally operated automatically: the driver simply placed the handle in full series or full parallel and the train accelerated to the appropriate speed. Thus each motor car "notched up" and switched from series to parallel at its own speed.

Opening was delayed by World War I: the first public services ran on 17 April 1916, and 16 weeks later the steam trains were withdrawn. Electricity was generated at the LYR's power station at Clifton Junction. (The station there is now known simply as Clifton.)

These units were withdrawn in 1959/60 and scrapped, being replaced by stock that became Class 504. Two bogies survived, which were used as temporary bogies in Bury depot when those of Class 504 units were removed for maintenance. When the depot closed in 1991, the bogies were scrapped.

=== Battery electric shunter ===
A four-wheeled, battery-electric shunter was built as a low priority job between 1917 and 1918 and used at Clifton power station. There are some claims it later operated in Scotland. It was noted at Derby Works in May 1946 and is understood to have operated at the Greenhill Sleeper Works in Derby from 1946.

== See also ==
- Hall Road rail accident
