= West London line =

Railway line in London

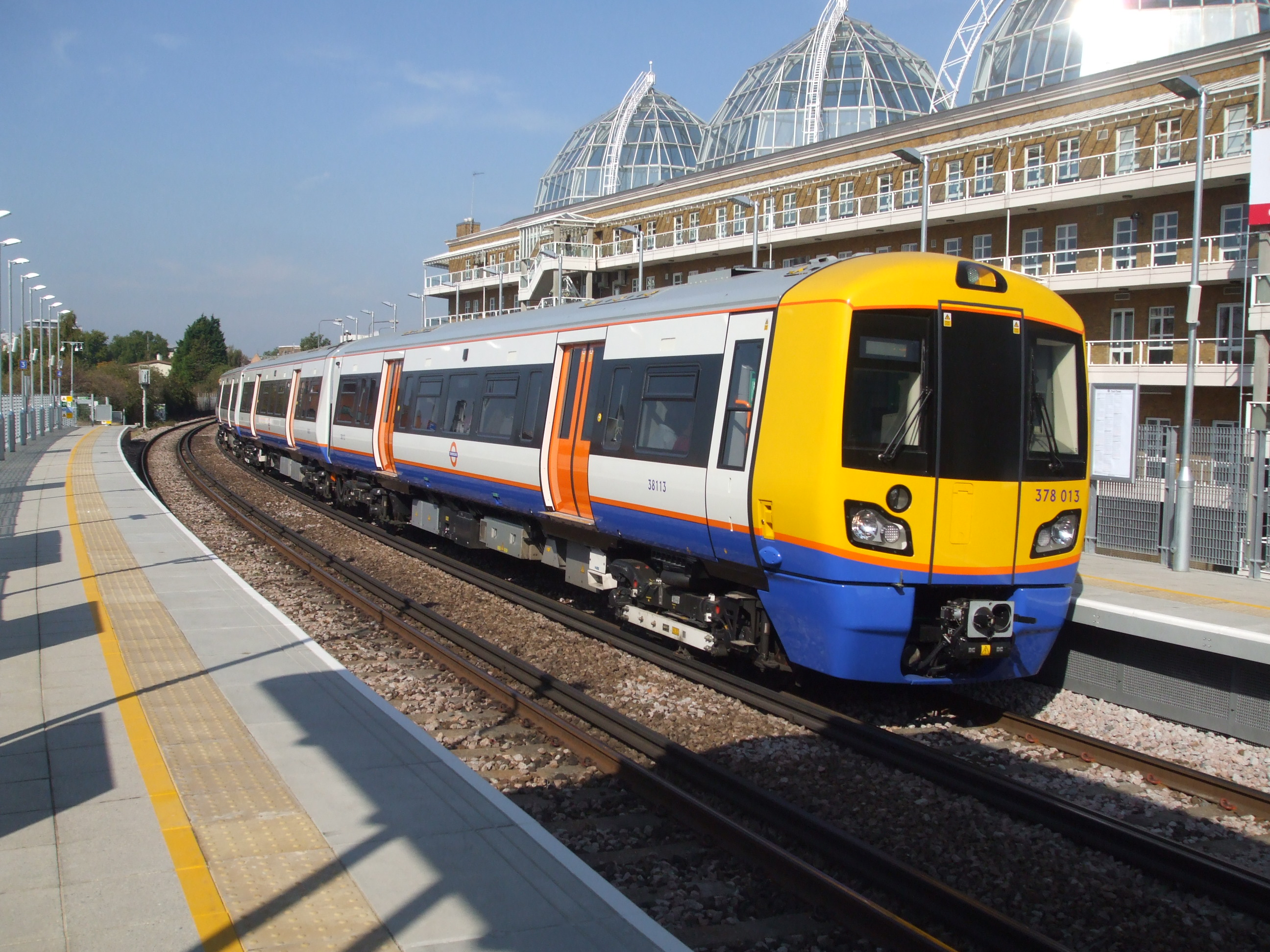
- A Class 378 train operated for London Overground at Imperial Wharf, September 2009

Overview
- Status: Operational
- Owner: Network Rail
- Locale: Greater London
- Termini: Willesden Junction 51.5324°N 0.2446°W; Clapham Junction 51.4642°N 0.1703°W
- Stations: 6

Service
- Type: Suburban rail; freight rail
- System: London Overground; National Rail
- Operators: Overground: First Rail London; National Rail: Southern
- Rolling stock: Overground: Class 378 / Class 710; Southern: Class 377

Technical
- Number of tracks: Two
- Track gauge: 1,435 mm (4 ft 8 1/2 in) standard gauge
- Electrification: Third rail, 750 V DC; Overhead line, 25 kV 50 Hz AC
Route map
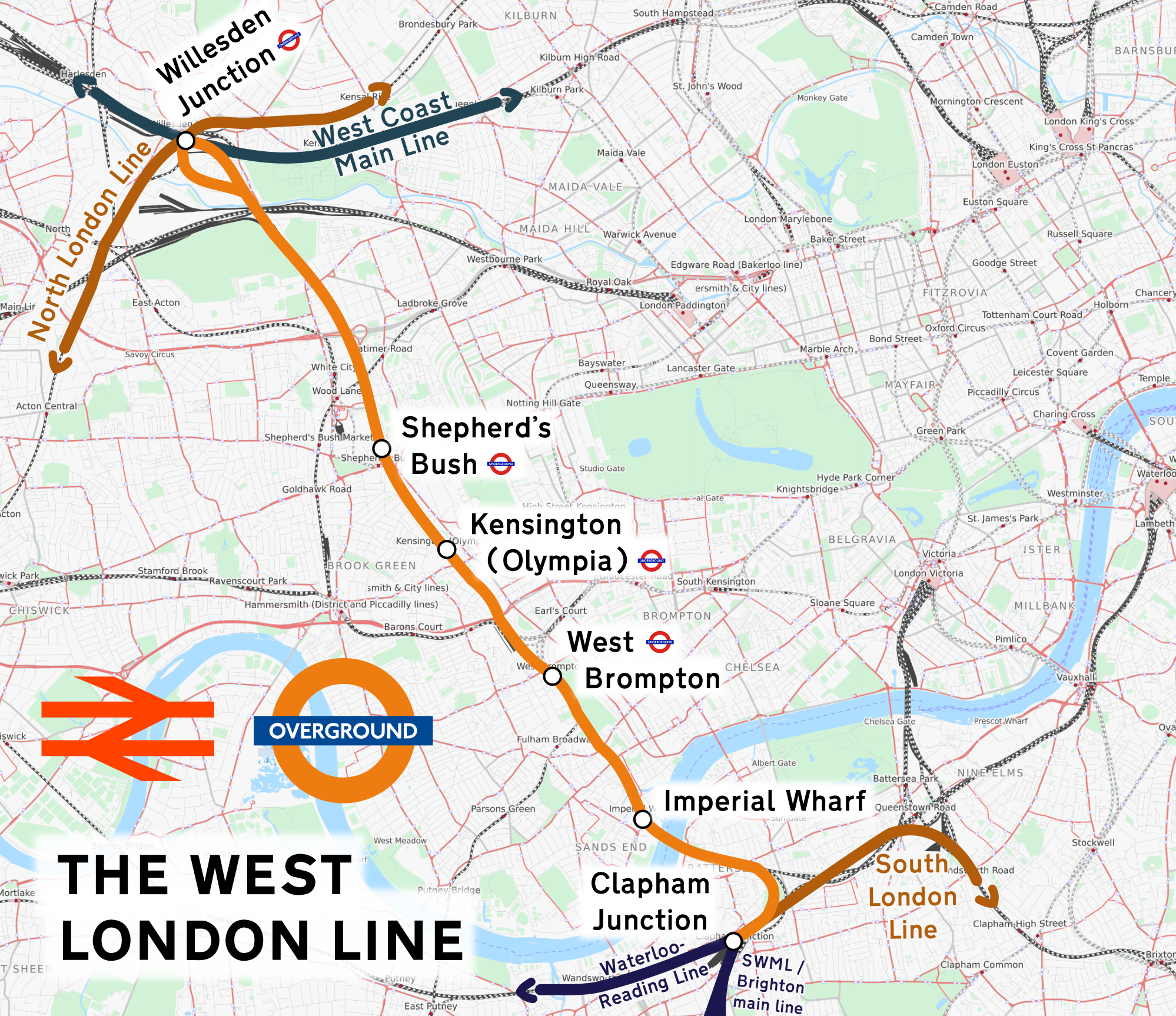
(Click to expand)

The West London line (WLL) is a railway line in inner West London that links Willesden Junction in the north to Clapham Junction in the south. The line has always been an important cross-London link, especially for freight services. Southern and London Overground provide regular passenger services; detailed below.

In November 2024, the London Overground service on the line was named, along with that on the North London line, the Mildmay line (to honour the Mildmay Mission Hospital which treated victims of the HIV/AIDS crisis in the 1980s) and coloured light blue on the Tube map.

== History ==
=== Origins ===
The Birmingham, Bristol and Thames Junction Railway was authorised in 1836 to run from the London and Birmingham Railway (L&BR), near the present Willesden Junction station, across the proposed route of the Great Western Railway (GWR) on the level, to the Kensington Canal Basin. For about twelve years, the railway ran alongside the Kensington Canal, formerly Counter's Creek, a minor tributary of the Thames River until it was filled in, the water course turned into a sewer and the future District line built over it. Construction was delayed by engineering and financial problems. Renamed the West London Railway (WLR) the line officially opened on 27 May 1844, and regular services began on 10 June, but before that trials to demonstrate the potential of the atmospheric railway system had been held from 1840 to 1843 on a half-mile section of track adjacent to Wormwood Scrubs, leased to that system's promoters; The WLR used conventional power but was not a commercial success. After only six months it closed on 30 November 1844.

The London and Birmingham Railway Act 1845 (8 & 9 Vict. c. clvi) authorised the GWR and the L&BR (which became part of the London and North Western Railway [LNWR] in 1846) to take a joint lease of the WLR. The line was used only to carry coal, and passenger service was not re-introduced. The lack of success of the line became such a regular target of Punch magazine that the line was called Punch's Railway.

The West London Extension Railway Act 1859 (22 & 23 Vict. c. cxxxiv) granted those two companies, with the London, Brighton and South Coast Railway (LB&SCR) and the London and South Western Railway (L&SWR), powers to construct the West London Extension Joint Railway on the filled-in canal south from the Kensington Basin to the bridge under the Kings Road, to bridge the Thames and to connect near Clapham Junction to railways south of the river. The existing line was doubled, and the flat crossing of the GWR main line, where a number of collisions had occurred, was replaced by a flyover. The new line opened on 2 March 1863 with a passenger station at Addison Road (now Kensington (Olympia)) slightly north of the original Kensington station, and was then well used by various inner London services for the remainder of the nineteenth century.

=== Operations to 1940 ===
For a time, the West London line formed part of the GWR's Middle Circle route (1872–1905) which ran (clockwise) from Mansion House to Aldgate (originally Moorgate) via Earl's Court, Kensington Olympia, Latimer Road and Baker Street. The West London line was also part of London Underground for a time and operated as a branch of the Metropolitan Railway between Edgware Road and Addison Road. The branch was eventually closed and the link between the West London line and today's Hammersmith & City line was dismantled in 1930.

A branch was installed to allow trains from the former Southern Railway to access to the West Coast Main Line and vice versa: in summer the London Midland and Scottish Railway ran from as far north as Glasgow to the South Coast. Through trains in the steam era changed locomotives here. From the 1920s there was a United Dairies depot on the site of a former dairy farm here, which up until the late 1970s had regular milk train deliveries.

The northern section of the line, from Willesden Junction to Kensington Olympia and on to Earls Court, was electrified by the LNWR in 1915.

=== Decline after World War II ===
After a period of popularity, passenger usage dwindled on the West London Railway. Competition from the new deep-level Underground railways and electric tramways took away custom by offering more direct routes into Central London. With the onset of World War II, the West London line was badly hit in some parts by enemy action during the Blitz and the demise of the line was hastened by wartime bombing. In 1940, LMS steam trains from Clapham Junction to Kensington ceased on 20 October and the services to Willesden and Edgware Road Met electric services ceased on 3 and 20 October respectively.

In 1948, the line became part of British Rail, following the nationalisation of the railways, but remained mostly in use as a freight route. For many years, limited passenger trains ran on workday mornings and evenings, to carry workers at the Post Office Savings Bank headquarters, Blythe House, near Olympia from Clapham Junction and back again, but these services were not publicly advertised.

Kensington Olympia was used as late as the 1970s as a location for collecting milk tanks (for the west country) from various terminals in the London area such as Ilford. This activity later transferred to Clapham Junction.

Evolution of the West London line

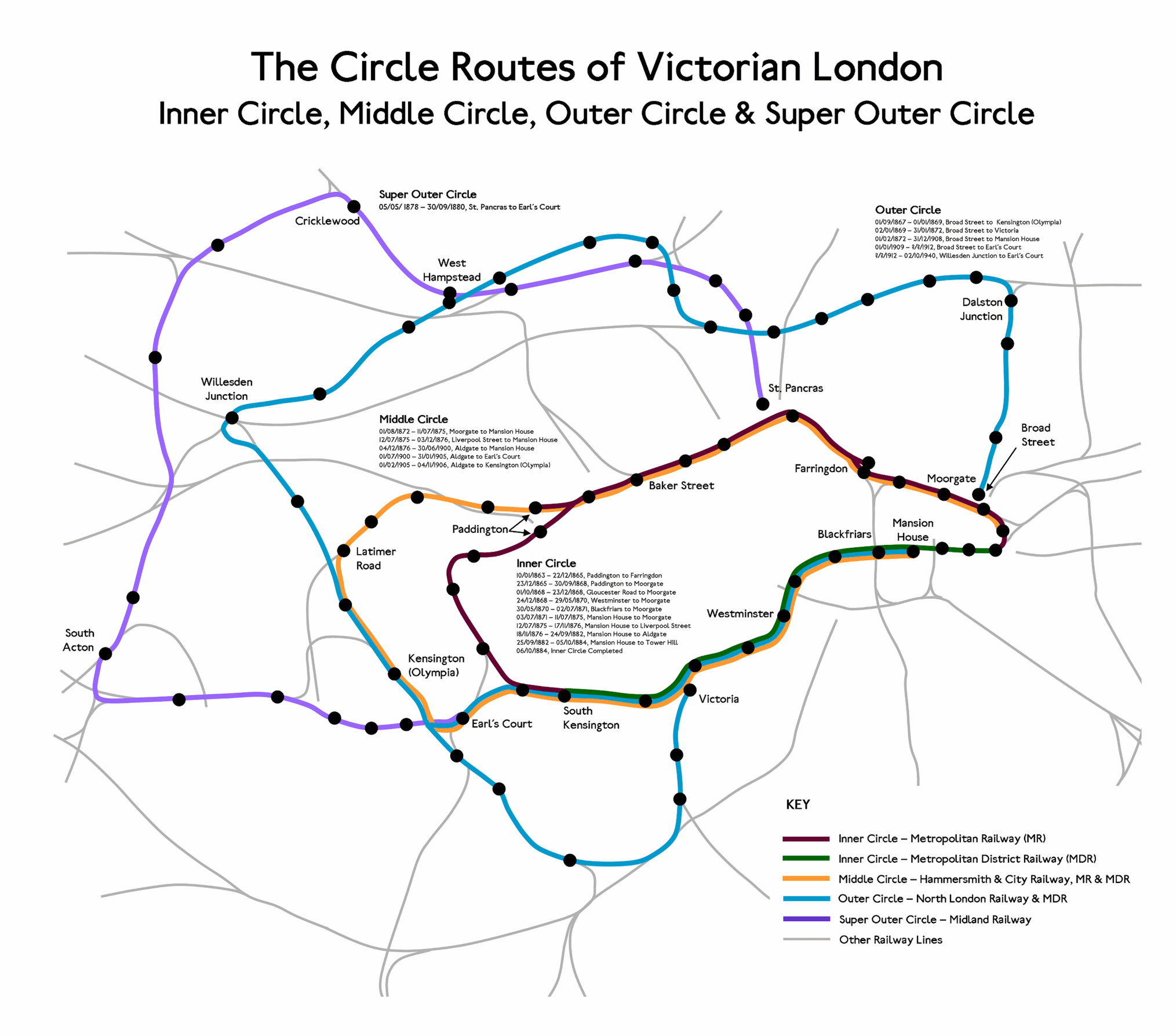
Map of the former Middle Circle route (1872–1905)

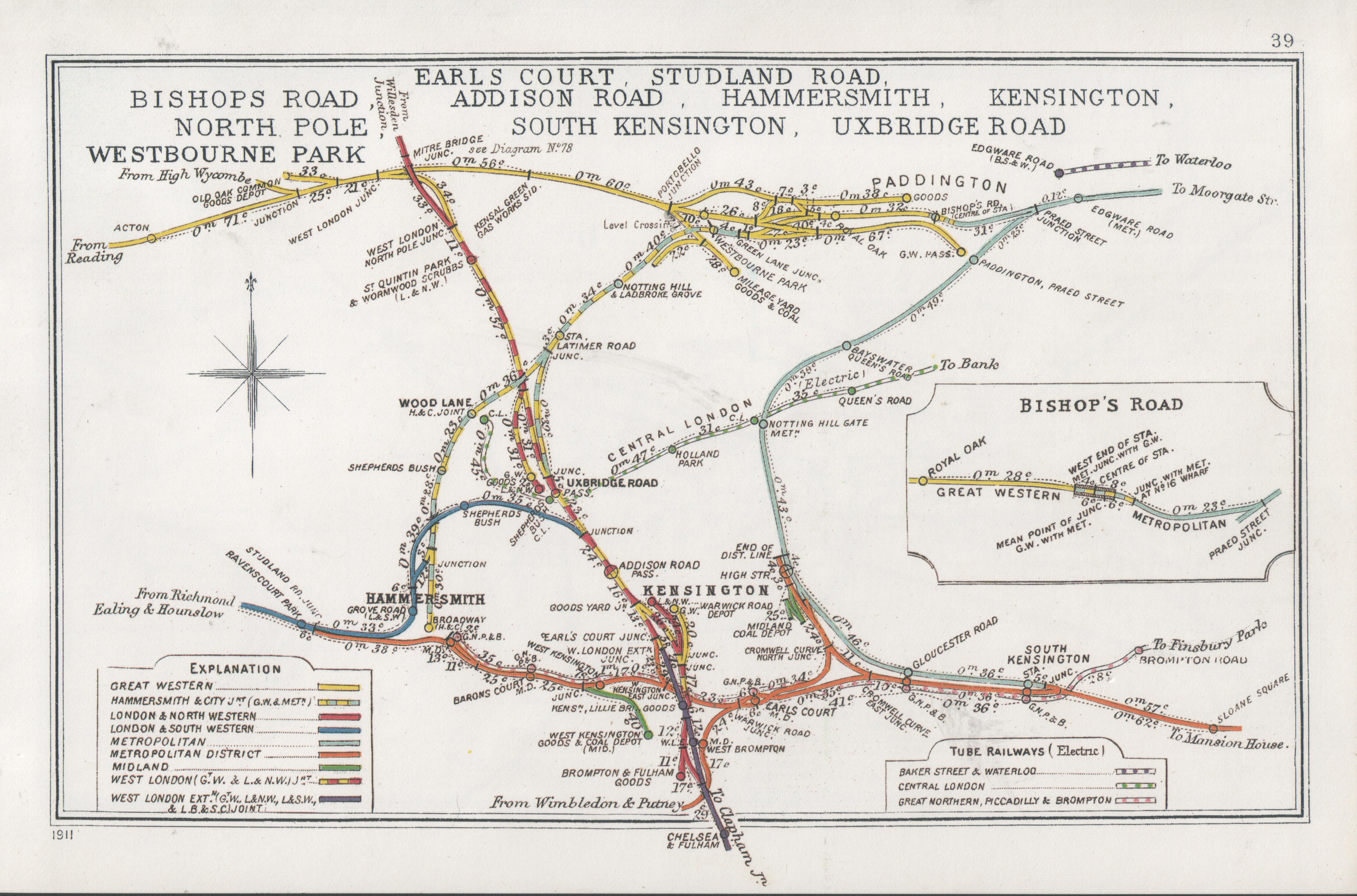
A 1911 map of the West London line and junctions

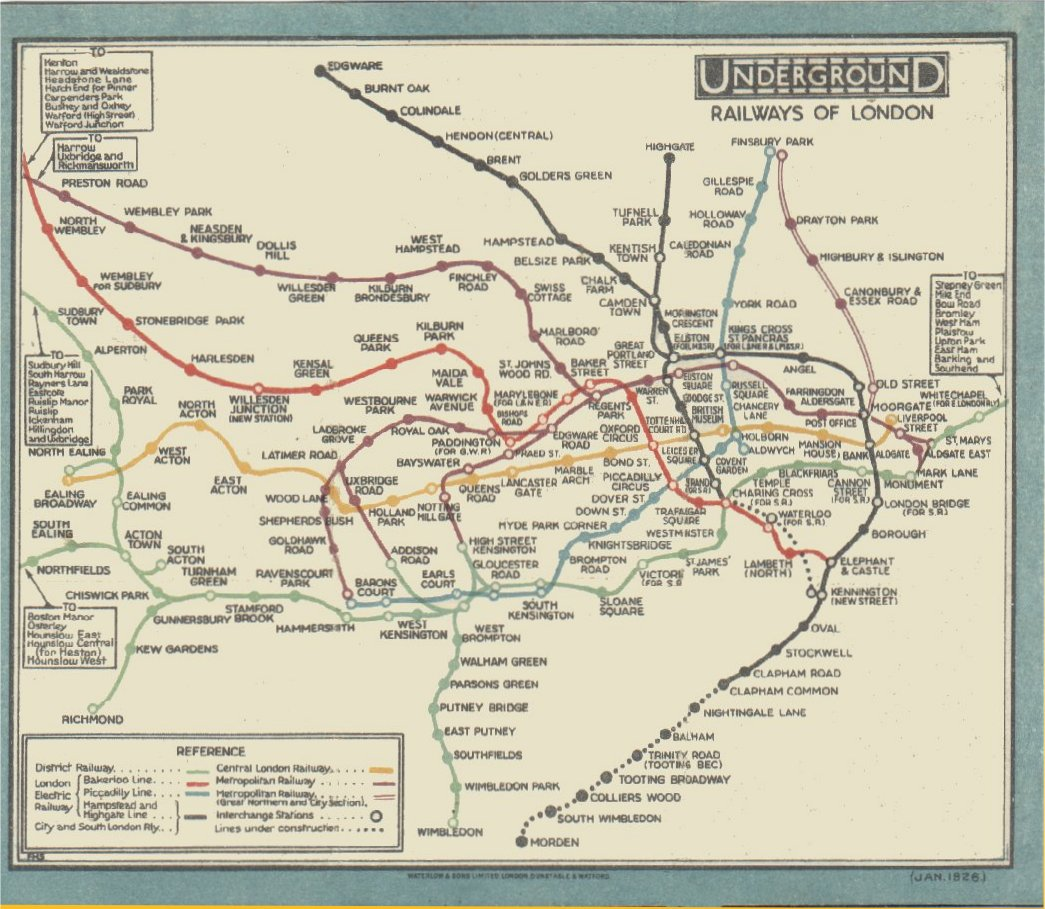
A 1926 Tube map showing West London line stations

The West London line has been used by London's railways in many ways over time

=== Reinstatement of passenger services ===
Since the 1940s the line has often been used for excursion and other special through trains across London to the South Coast. Between April 1963 and June 1965 the section between Willesden Junction and Kensington Olympia was used for trains diverted from Euston during the rebuilding of Euston station. Kensington Olympia station was refurbished accordingly. During 1967 passenger services were diverted from Paddington between Old Oak Common and Kensington Olympia during engineering works at Paddington station.

In the late 1970s, the Greater London Council began to revitalise the North London line (NLL), incorporating it onto the Tube Map in 1977 as a white line with black borders marked "British Rail" and electrifying the route from Dalston to Woolwich in 1985. The limited Clapham Junction – Kensington Olympia service appeared in the public timetables, but full passenger services on the West London line were not re-introduced until 1994 by Network SouthEast service. In 1997, as part of the privatisation of British Rail, operation of both the West London line and North London line was brought under the North London Railway franchise, and taken over by National Express, trading as Silverlink. For a decade, the West London line was operated with the green-and-purple liveried Silverlink Metro trains.

Channel Tunnel infrastructure work in 1993 electrified the line at 750 V DC third rail from the South to the North Pole depot. The line is electrified at 25 kV AC overhead wires from Westway (near the overbridge carrying the Hammersmith and City Line) to Willesden and the North. Until the High Speed 1 railway line from St Pancras opened in November 2007, Eurostar trains from Waterloo International used the West London line to access their North Pole depot.

The line was crucial to the planned Regional Eurostar service, and between 1995 and 1997 carried two daily services connecting the ECML and WCML respectively to Waterloo for international passengers. However the idea was cancelled.

Platforms were reinstated at West Brompton in 1999. In 2007, Transport for London took over the North London Railway franchise as the London Overground concession, introducing new rolling stock and rebranding the West London line trains and stations in orange livery. The line appears today on the Tube Map in the light blue colour of the Mildmay line part of the London Overground network. New stations opened at Shepherd's Bush in 2008 and Imperial Wharf in 2009, bringing main line rail services to a large catchment area in West London.

Historical West London line operators

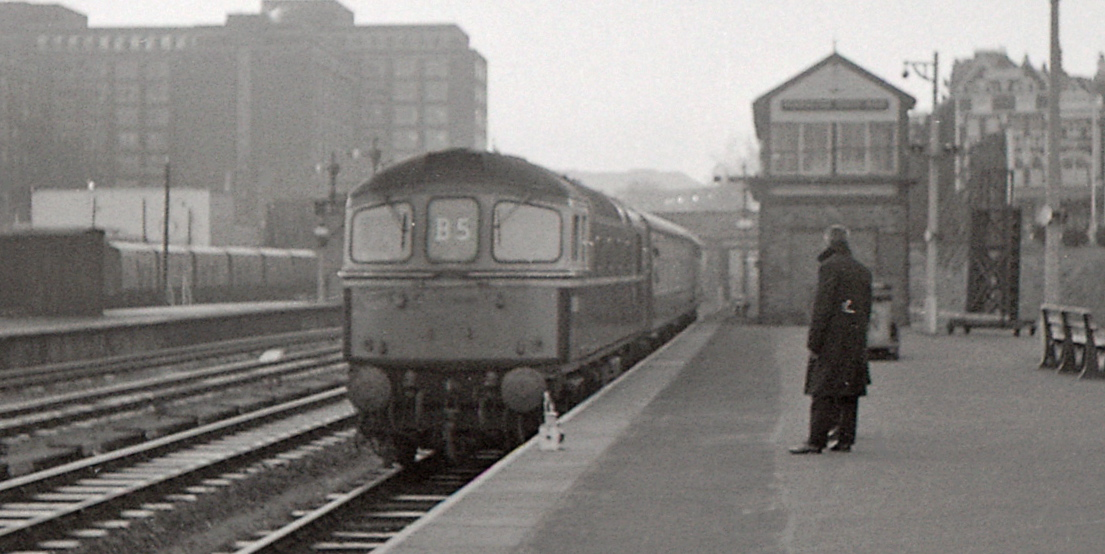
The unadvertised Post Office workers' train at Olympia in 1968

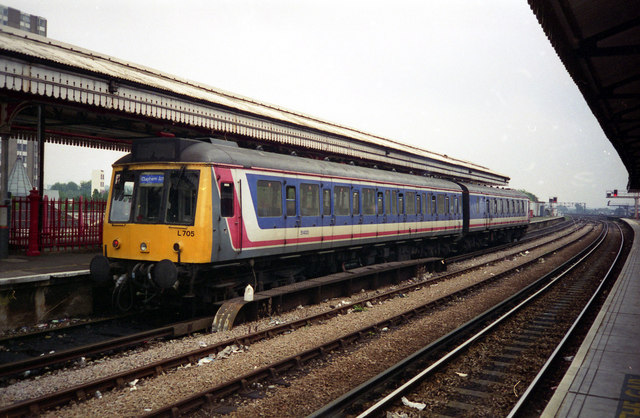
The West London line passenger service, revived in 1994 by BR Network Southeast and run as a diesel service (pictured here at Clapham Junction in 1995)

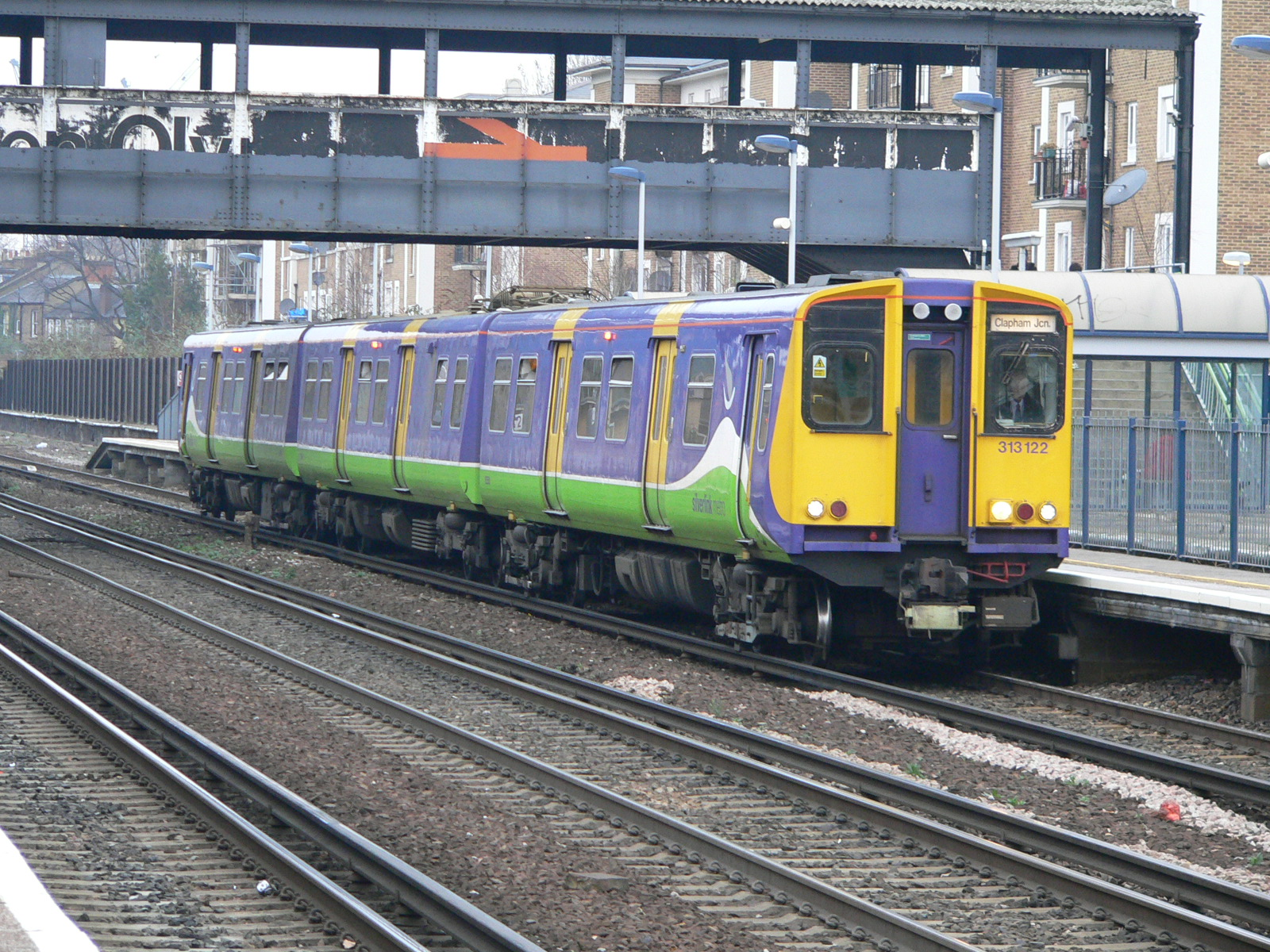
the fully electric West London line service during the days of Silverlink at Olympia (2006)

The changing face of passenger trains on the West London line

=== Regional and InterCity services ===
In 1966 British Rail launched Motorail, a long-distance accompanied car train which transported passengers and their cars to the West of England and Scotland. The London Motorail terminal was at Kensington (Olympia), using the West London line for its wide connections to the UK mainline rail network. Motorail ceased operations in 1981.

Intercity prior to 1997, and then from 1997 to 2007 Virgin CrossCountry operated a long-distance service between Edinburgh Waverley and Manchester Piccadilly and Brighton, in addition Intercity operated Summer Saturday services Liverpool to Dover Western Docks and Manchester to Eastbourne which use the West London line route to cross from Acton Main Line, stopping at Olympia and passing through Clapham Junction. The CrossCountry franchise was taken over by Arriva CrossCountry and in 2008 the Brighton route was terminated.

In 2009, Southern introduced its cross-London service from Milton Keynes to East Croydon. For a brief period, Southern and Connex also operated a direct service from Rugby to Brighton via Gatwick Airport, but this was withdrawn in 2001.

== Train services ==
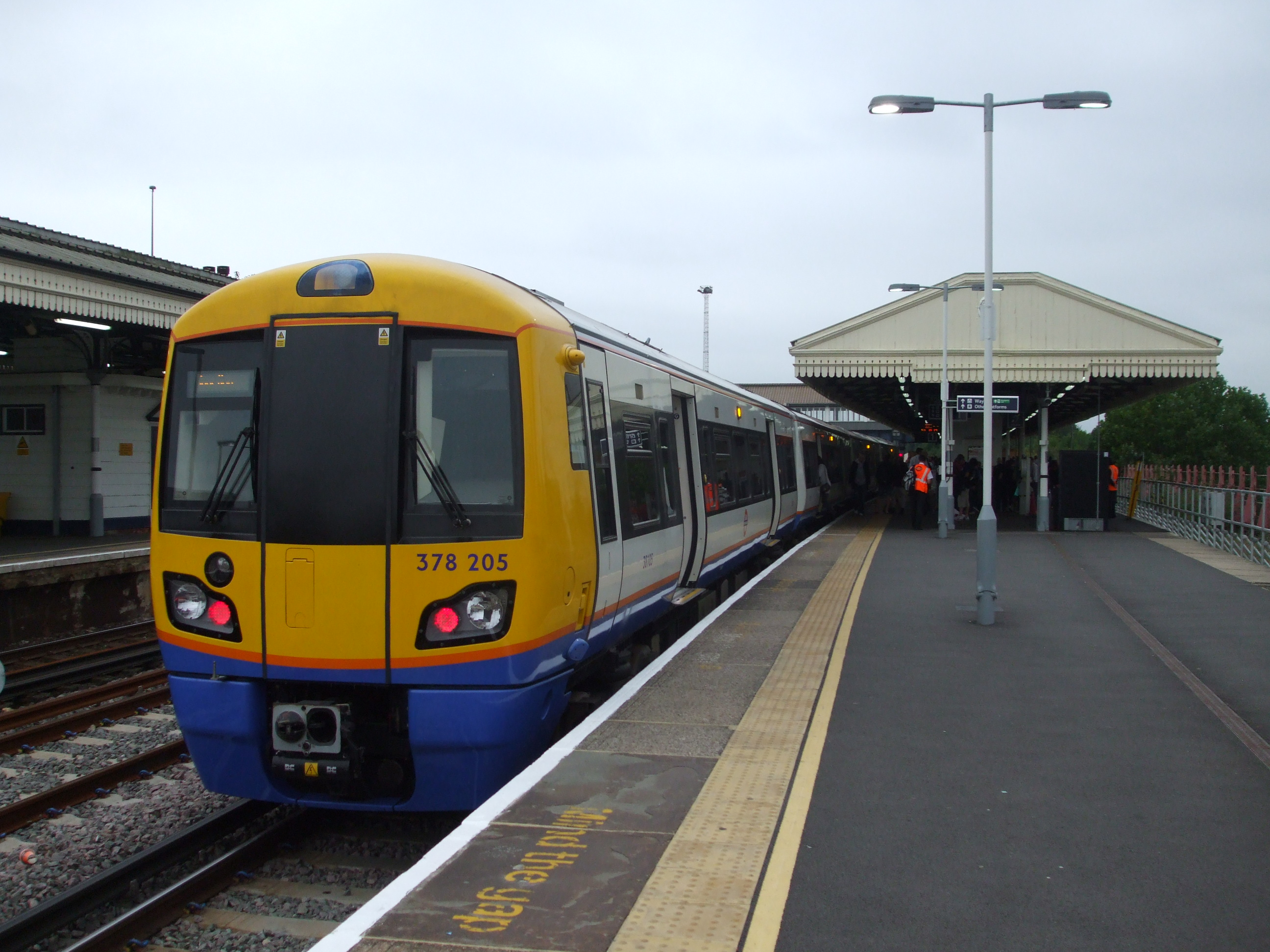
London Overground train on the West London line

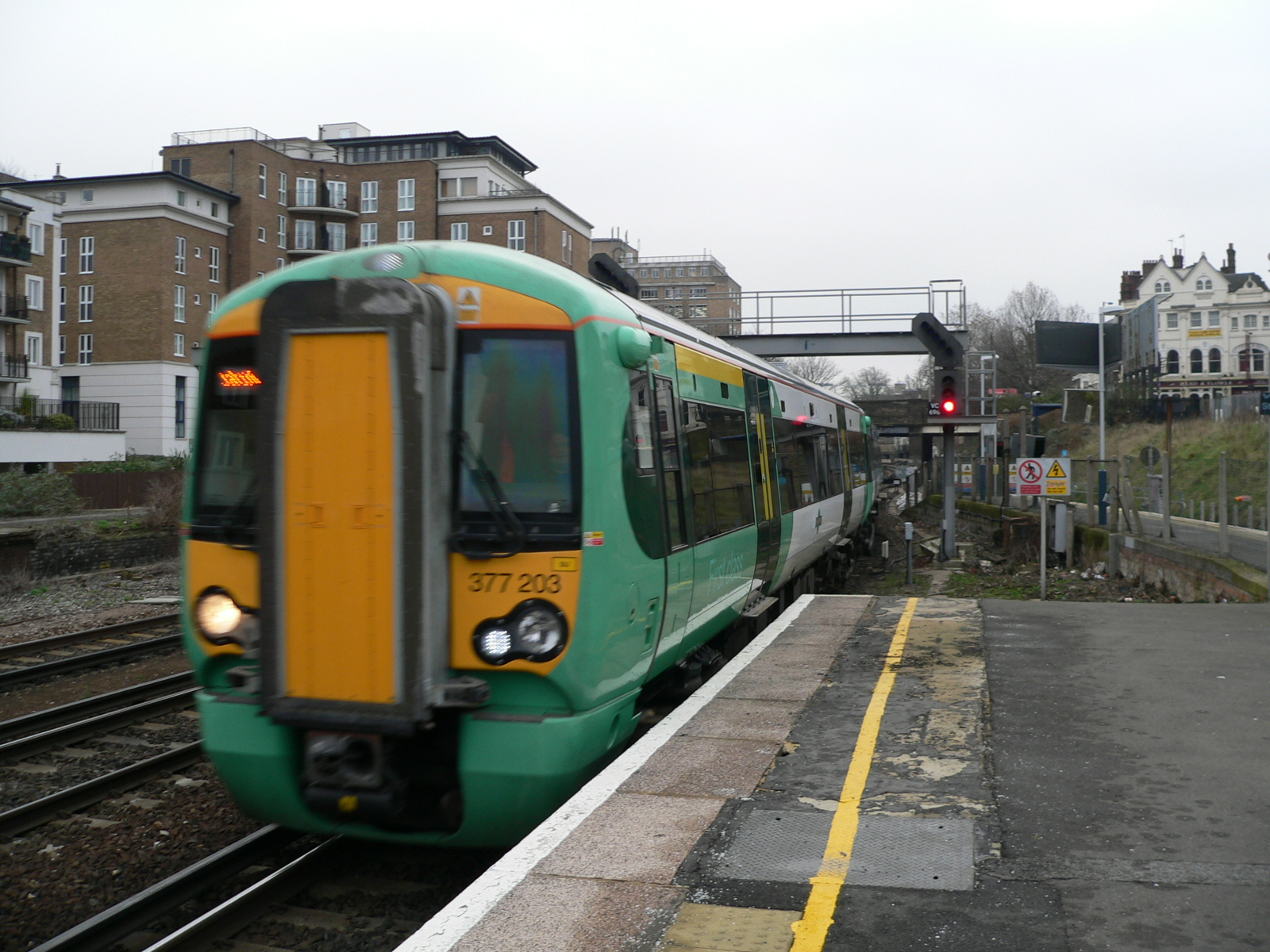
Southern train on the West London line

=== London Overground ===
The core operation of the West London line is the suburban rail service operated by London Overground. Four trains per hour run between Clapham Junction and Willesden Junction, with most trains continuing on the North London line to and from Stratford. It forms the western section of the Overground's orbital rail route which was completed in December 2012 when the East London line was extended to Clapham Junction via the South London line, linking it to the West London line.

In July 2023, TFL announced that it would be giving each of the six Overground services unique names by the end of the following year. In February 2024, it was confirmed that services on the line would be named the Mildmay line (to honour the Mildmay Hospital which treated victims of the HIV/AIDS crisis in the 1980s) and would be coloured blue on the updated network map. The new name started to be used in November 2024.

=== Cross-London services ===
Along with the Thameslink and the East London line routes, the West London line presently forms part of the West London Route which is one of three National Rail routes which run across London instead of terminating in the central area. This regional rail service operated by Southern connects the West Coast Main Line in the north to the Brighton Main Line in the south. Hourly trains run between East Croydon and Watford Junction, with additional peak services between Shepherd's Bush and Clapham Junction. Southern services pass through Willesden Junction without stopping as the mainline platforms were removed in 1962. However there are plans for these services to stop at Willesden Junction in the future which will mean building new main line platforms at Willesden Junction.

This regional service previously ran from Brighton to Watford Junction. It was originally conceived as a Brighton-Birmingham service, and until December 2008 a twice-daily CrossCountry service ran from Brighton via Kensington (Olympia) and Reading to Birmingham New Street. The service was curtailed due to the difficulty in securing train paths in the congested West Midlands, and operated only as far as Rugby. With engineering works on the upgrade of the West Coast Main Line, the service was shortened to terminate at Watford, and was discontinued, and later revived as a shorter regional route as part of the South Central franchise in 2008. Due to congestion on the West Coast Main Line, the service did not run north of Milton Keynes Central, and in May 2022 was curtailed to Watford Junction.

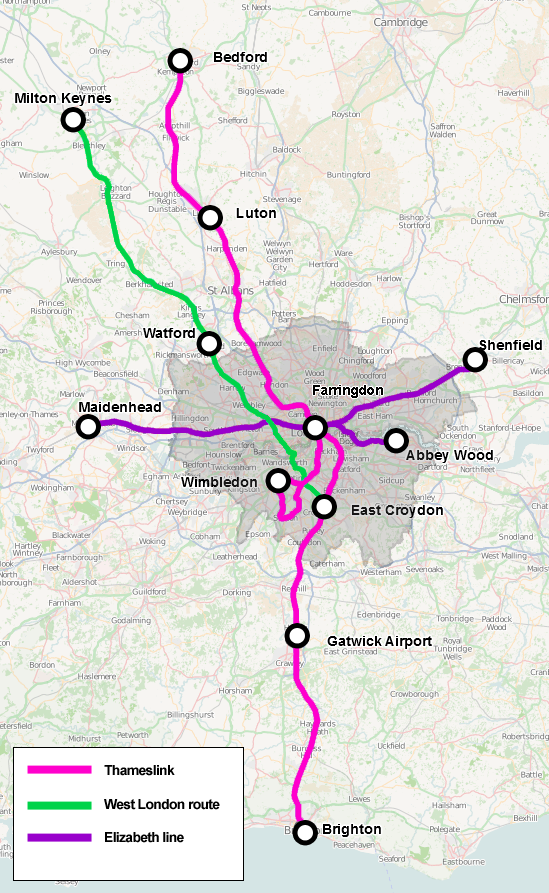
Map of cross-London rail routes present and planned

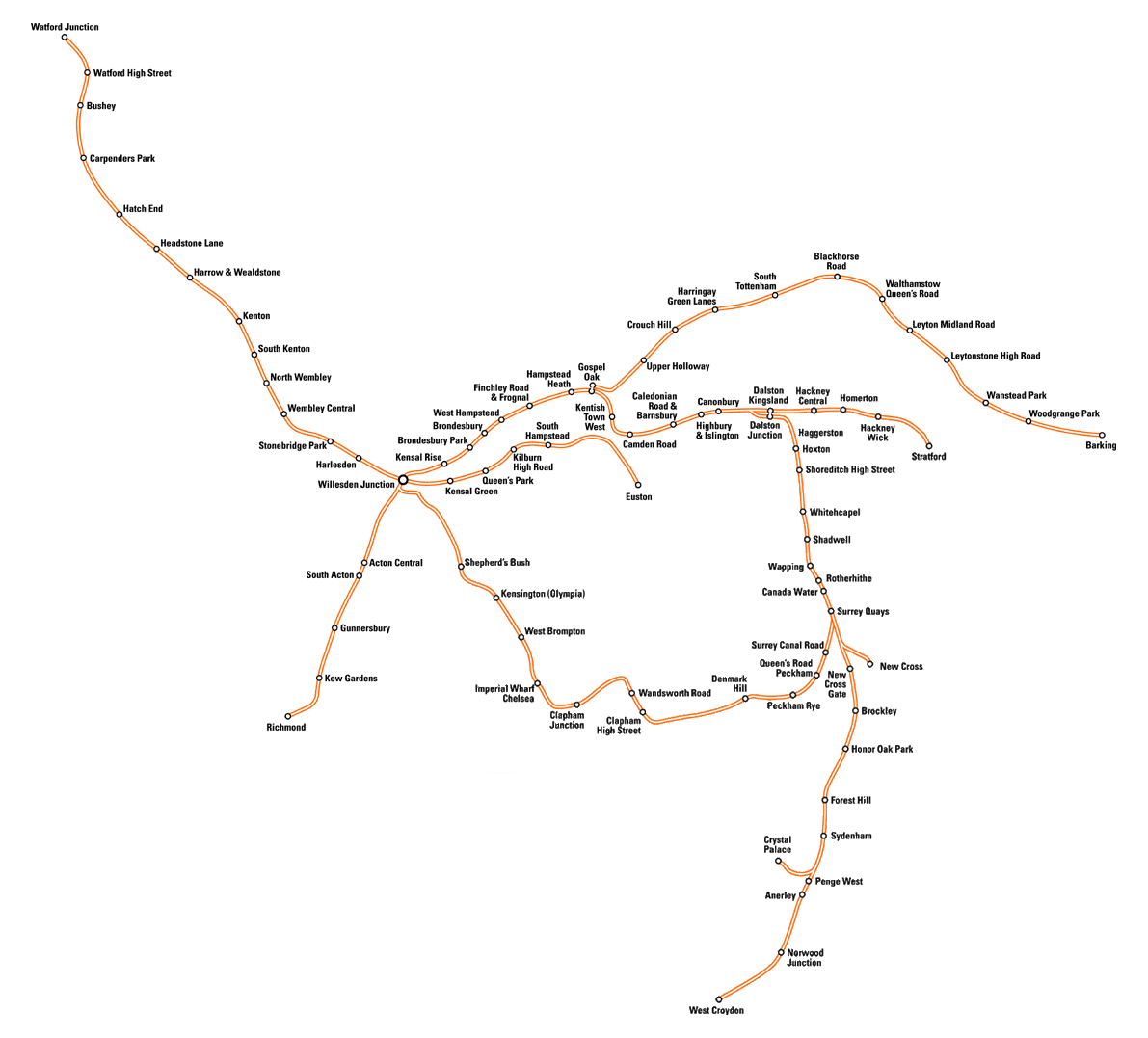
The orbital lines of the London Overground network (as of 9 December 2012)

Line map of the West London line, showing connections and London fare zones

== Route ==
From north to south, to line follows the following route with current and former stations, junctions with other railways and other features:

=== Current route ===
Station	Image	Location	Interchange & notes
Willesden Junction	Willesden Junction	51.5327°N 0.2455°W	Bakerloo; North London line Watford DC line West London line trains use the high-level platforms shared with the North London line (NLL); Watford DC & Bakerloo lines use the low-level platforms
Shepherd's Bush	Shepherd's Bush Overground stn	51.5051°N 0.2176°W	Central Opened September 2008 on the site of the former Uxbridge Road station
Kensington (Olympia)	File:Kensington Olympia	51.4986°N 0.2108°W	District Opened in 1862 as Addison Road
West Brompton	West Brompton West London line platforms	51.4866°N 0.1957°W	District WLL platforms situated parallel to the Underground platforms closed in 1940 following World War II bomb damage; reopened 1999, restoring District line interchange
Imperial Wharf	Imperial Wharf station	51.4752°N 0.1828°W	River Opened 2009 as part of the expansion of London Overground
Clapham Junction	An overground train terminates at Clapham Junction	LOC	South London line National Rail WLL terminates in a bay platform parallel to Waterloo to Reading Line, shared with terminating South London line services. Southern trains call at platforms on the other side of the station before continuing south to East Croydon.

=== Former route ===
Station	Image	Location	Interchange & notes
Willesden Junction	Willesden Junction	51.5327°N 0.2455°W	Bakerloo; North London line Watford DC line West London line trains use the high-level platforms shared with the North London line (NLL); Watford DC & Bakerloo lines use the low-level platforms
West London Junction	Map of Willesden Junction station and lines	51.5302°N 0.2445°W	After Willesden Junction, the line heads south and crosses the West Coast Main Line via a bridge; the WLL separates from the NLL, which heads southwest towards Richmond.
Mitre Bridge Junction	Map of the branch of the West Coast Main Line branch	51.5270°N 0.2361°W	Junction located just south of bridge over Hythe Road; the WLL curves east before turning south towards Shepherd's Bush. Southern services from Watford Junction join the WLL at this junction after branching off from the WCML near Willesden Junction and curving south over a level crossing.
Mitre Bridge	Mitre Bridge	51.5270°N 0.2361°W	Cantilever bridge which crosses the Great Western Main Line and the Grand Union Canal close to Old Oak Common TMD
North Pole Junction	File:North Pole depot trainshed	51.5240°N 0.2329°W	End-on junction; connection to former Eurostar North Pole depot, which is parallel to the GWR main line. The WLJR proper starts here.
St Quintin Park & Wormwood Scrubs (closed)	Bridge over North Pole Road	51.5204°N 0.2279°W	Destroyed by wartime bombing in 1940
Westway flyover	The Westway from the West London line	51.5168°N 0.2233°W	Just north of the Westway flyover is the AC/DC changeover point where electric trains switch power supply: 25 kV AC overhead lines to the north, 750 V DC third rail to the south
Junction with the Metropolitan Railway (dismantled)	Map of the Circle Routes of Victorian London showing the Latimer Rd link	51.5106°N 0.2199°W	This former eastbound spur linked the WLL to the line which is today the Hammersmith & City line via Latimer Road when the WLL formed part of the Middle Circle route from 1872 to 1905
Shepherd's Bush	Shepherd's Bush Overground stn	51.5051°N 0.2176°W	Central Opened September 2008 on the site of the former Uxbridge Road station.
Junction with the L&SWR (dismantled)	1889 map showing the L&SWR junction with the WLL	51.5021°N 0.2151°W	A former westbound spur connecting the WLL to the Hammersmith & City line via Shepherd's Bush, removed in 1930
Kensington (Olympia)	File:Kensington Olympia	51.4986°N 0.2108°W	District Opened in 1862 as Addison Road
West London Extension Junction	1914 diagram of railways in the Earls Court area	51.4947°N 0.2053°W	End-on junction between the two parts of the line; extensive goods yards owned by LNWR and GWR
West Brompton	West Brompton West London line platforms	51.4866°N 0.1957°W	District WLL platforms situated parallel to the Underground platforms closed in 1940 following World War II bomb damage; reopened 1999, restoring District line interchange
Chelsea & Fulham (closed)	The West London line at Fulham	51.4803°N 0.1875°W	Station closed in 1940 following World War II bomb damage; a goods line branched off south of the station to Chelsea Basin (the present-day site of Chelsea Harbour Pier)
Imperial Wharf	Imperial Wharf station	51.4752°N 0.1828°W	River Opened 2009 as part of the expansion of London Overground
Battersea Railway Bridge	Battersea Bridge	51.4731°N 0.1792°W	Crosses the River Thames
Battersea (closed)	Site of Battersea Station in 1962	51.4715°N 0.1722°W	Closed in 1940 following World War II bomb damage
Latchmere Junctions	diagram of Latchmere Junctions and Clapham Jcn	51.4708°N 0.1678°W	Connections to the South West Main Line (Waterloo) & the Brighton & Chatham Main Lines (London Victoria). Southern trains branch off here to traverse the main lines via a dive-under. When the WLL formed part of the Outer Circle route (1872–1908), trains would branch off here to Victoria.
Clapham Junction	An overground train terminates at Clapham Junction	LOC	South London line National Rail WLL terminates in a bay platform parallel to Waterloo to Reading Line, shared with terminating South London line services. Southern trains call at platforms on the other side of the station before continuing south to East Croydon.

The West Cross Route, one side of the Ringway 1 inner ring road, would have paralleled the line.

== Rolling stock ==
Trains in scheduled passenger services on the West London line are as follows:

Class	Image	Type	Top speed		Routes operated
Class	Image	Type	mph	km/h	Routes operated
British Rail Class 377/2	Southern Class 377 at West Brompton	EMU	100	160	Southern; Watford Junction to East Croydon
British Rail Class 377/7		EMU	100	160	Southern; Watford Junction to East Croydon
British Rail Class 378/2	London Overground class 378 train at Shepherd's Bush railway station	EMU	75	120	London Overground; Willesden Junction to Clapham Junction
British Rail Class 710/3	London Overground class 710 train at Willesden Junction railway station	EMU	75	120	London Overground; Willesden Junction to Clapham Junction

== Passenger volume ==
These are passenger volume statistics for the line from the years beginning April 2002 to April 2022. The large increases in the year beginning April 2006 were due to travelcards for National Rail journeys being made available from stations with London Underground ticket offices, and also using a different methodology to estimate likely journeys made from National Rail stations in Zone 1. The large increases in the year beginning April 2010 were due to increased train frequencies helped by the introduction of new rolling stock. Shepherd's Bush opened 2008 and Imperial Wharf the following year. There was a significant change in methodology for estimating usage of London stations in 2015–16, resulting in large changes in usage numbers for some stations.

Station usage
Station name	2002–03	2004–05	2005–06	2006–07	2007–08	2008–09	2009–10	2010–11	2011–12	2012–13	2013–14	2014–15	2015–16	2016–17	2017–18	2018–19	2019–20	2020–21	2021–22	2022–23	2023–24	2024–25
Willesden Junction	1,658,719	1,858,277	1,976,305	1,472,634	1,350,707	1,202,578	1,780,980	2,377,316	3,504,304	3,651,506	3,964,254	4,802,446	6,243,172	6,196,804	6,069,606	5,943,590	6,019,360	2,795,956	5,357,538	6,367,758		
Shepherd's Bush	—N/a	—N/a	—N/a	—N/a	2,675	247,534	1,014,896	2,240,736	3,148,594	3,818,228	3,932,956	4,433,470	8,653,428	7,984,042	7,952,788	7,955,106	7,647,088	2,271,628	5,008,562	5,705,198		
Kensington Olympia	762,103	1,159,086	1,244,273	1,391,740	1,790,062	1,923,962	1,833,537	2,311,792	5,936,984	5,290,538	7,290,836	7,249,102	10,904,840	4,117,608	4,049,392	3,636,880	3,353,060	738,934	1,742,806	2,281,904		
West Brompton	131,414	313,725	411,667	518,781	632,970	643,852	887,692	1,506,006	2,103,946	2,501,626	2,524,228	3,365,504	5,625,750	5,226,416	5,249,830	4,936,112	4,516,992	1,411,158	3,027,020	3,510,570		
Imperial Wharf	—N/a	—N/a	—N/a	—N/a	—N/a	—N/a	119,250	737,388	1,230,734	1,579,564	1,818,380	1,982,780	3,290,200	3,133,002	3,193,608	3,123,322	2,863,374	1,010,064	2,324,442	2,706,930		
Clapham Junction	17,122,208	12,550,035	12,426,542	18,868,026	19,881,295	17,445,432	17,758,808	19,671,342	21,918,116	23,622,718	25,287,250	26,465,840	32,282,220	30,680,766	29,444,710	29,520,132	28,892,348	8,370,706	17,397,120	20,790,150		
The annual passenger usage is based on sales of tickets in stated financial years from Office of Rail and Road estimates of station usage. The statistics are for passengers arriving and departing from each station and cover twelve-month periods that start in April. Methodology may vary year on year. Usage since the period 2019–20 have been affected by the COVID-19 pandemic, especially the period 2020–23.

== Future ==
The Crossrail project instated the Elizabeth line, a new east-west cross-London route which uses the Great Western Main Line up to Reading, and crosses the West London line 0.5 kilometres (0.31 mi) south of Willesden Junction at Old Oak Common. A new station, Old Oak Common railway station, is planned at this site to provide an interchange between the Elizabeth line, the GWML and High Speed 2. Due to the proximity of Willesden Junction, it has been suggested that an interchange could be added with the North London, Bakerloo, Watford DC and West London lines. A 2010 Department for Transport command paper highlights opportunities for interchanges at Old Oak Common with London Underground, London Overground and Southern's cross-London services, while a report prepared by Terry Farrell and Partners for the Borough of Hammersmith & Fulham proposes the construction of an overhead light rail, automated people mover or personal rapid transit system linking "Old Oak Central" [sic] with Willesden Junction. However, as of 2013, no firm proposals exist to create an interchange with these lines.

Proposals for Old Oak Common being considered by Transport for London include a scheme to realign the routes of both the West London and North London lines around the Old Oak Common site to create a new London Overground interchange station. The proposal envisages diverting the NLL Richmond route to curve around the eastern side of Old Oak Common, and re-routing the WLL to branch west south of the Mitre Bridge before curving north along a short section of the Dudding Hill Line to join the West Coast Main Line. The NLL and WLL would meet at a point on the southern side of Old Oak Common, adjacent to Wormwood Scrubs, where new interchange platforms would be built. Alternative versions of this scheme also consider cheaper options such as terminating the WLL at Old Oak Common or two separate London Overground stations.

The West London line passes beneath the Earls Court Exhibition Centre along a complex intersection of track which crosses over the subsurface junction of three District line branches. The planned redevelopment of the site by Capital & Counties Properties envisages demolishing the Exhibition Centre to make way for retail and housing; as part of these plans, the West London line is to be enclosed by a concrete box. Commentators have noted that the proposals make no allowance for any future quadrupling of the track to increase capacity on the line.

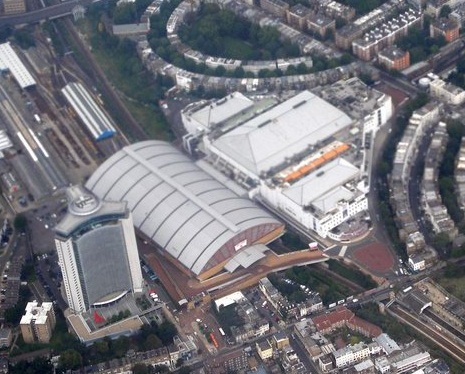
The West London & District lines passing under Earls Court

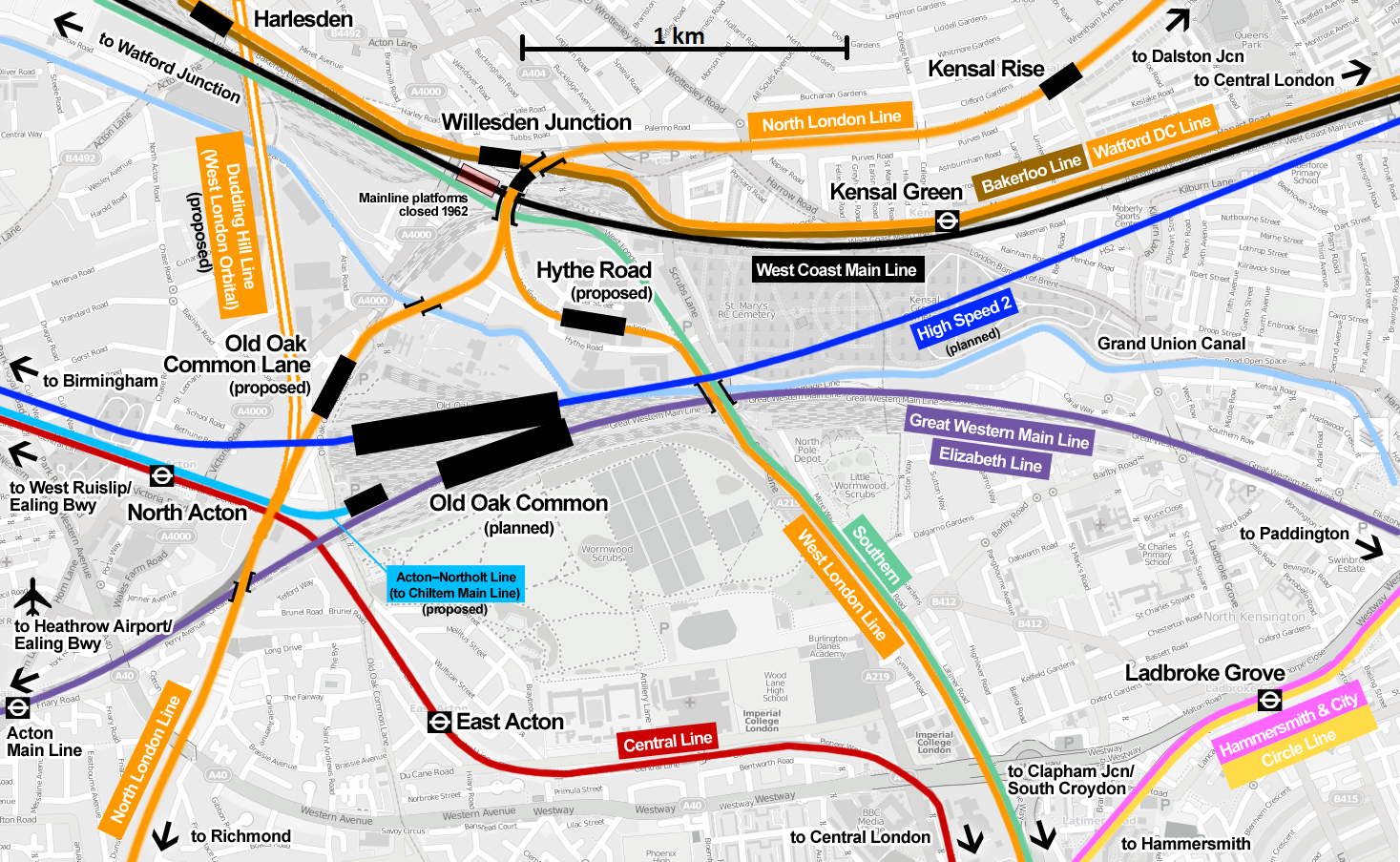
Map of the planned Old Oak Common station in relation to existing rail services

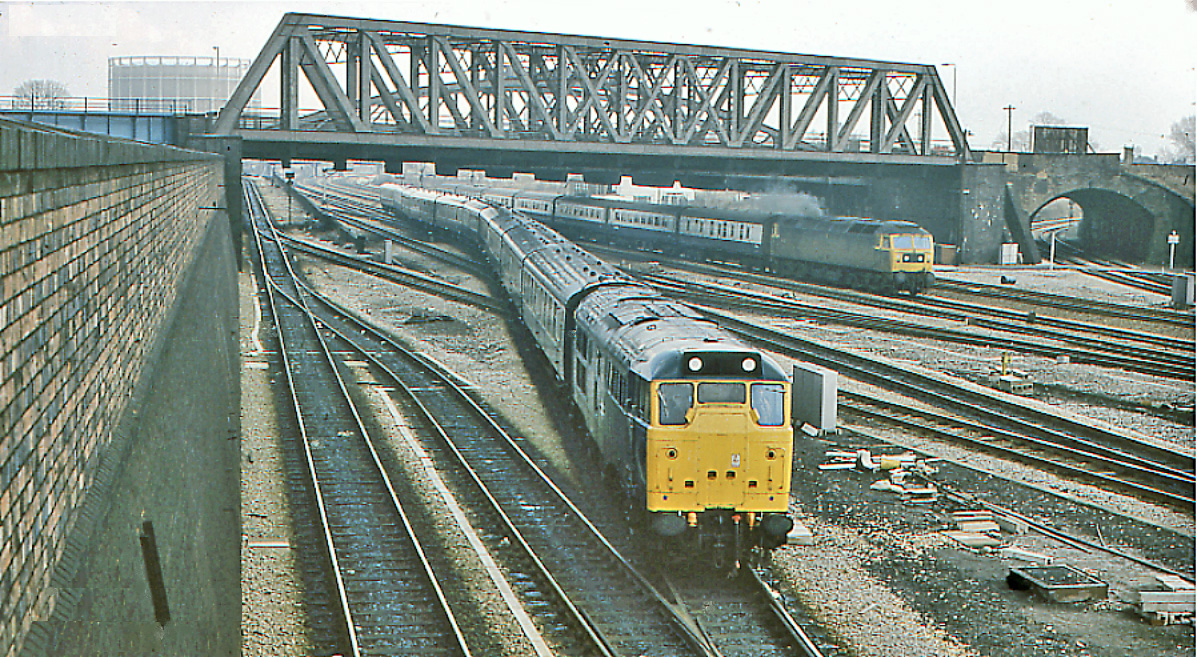
The West London line crosses Old Oak Common via Mitre Bridge (pictured here in 1979)
