= British Rail Class 502 =

Class of British electric multiple unit

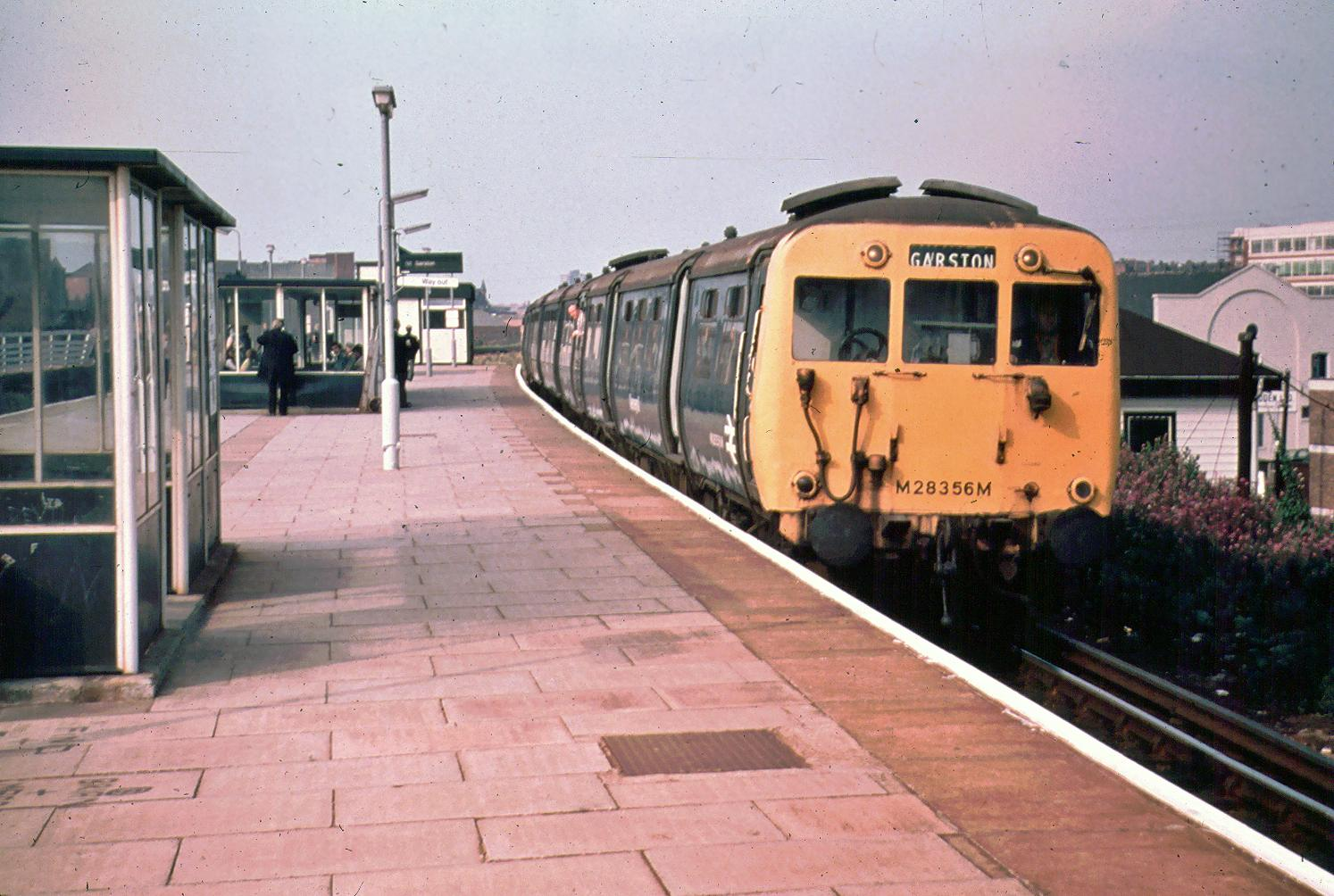
- Class 502 at Sandhills in 1979
- In service: 1939–1980
- Manufacturer: LMS
- Built at: Derby Works
- Replaced: LYR electric units
- Constructed: 1939-41
- Entered service: 1939-41
- Refurbished: c. 1968 (TC rebuilt as TS or DTC)
- Number built: 152 cars (total); 59 (DMBS); 50 (TS); 9 (TC); 34 (DTC)
- Number preserved: 2 cars (1 DMBS, 1 DTC)
- Number scrapped: 150 cars
- Formation: 3 or 2 cars: MBSO+TSO+DTCO; MBSO+TSO; MBSO+TCO
- Diagram: EB202 or LMS345 (DMBS); EE207 or LMS393 (DTS); EH202 or LMS379 (TS)
- Fleet numbers: 28311-28369 (DMBS); 29545-29594 (TS); 29812-29820 (TC); 29866-29899 (DTC)
- Capacity: 88S (DMBS); 102S (TS); 53F/29S (TC, as built); 82 (TS, rebuilt TC); 47F/29S (DTC, rebuilt TC); 53F/29S (DTC)
- Operators: LMS; British Rail
- Depots: Meols Cop; Hall Road; Kirkdale
- Line served: Northern Line

Specifications
- Car body construction: Steel
- Car length: 66 ft 6 in (20.27 m)
- Width: 9 ft 3 in (2.82 m) (over body)
- Height: 11 ft 7 1/16 in (3.53 m) (over vents)
- Floor height: 3 ft 10 3/16 in (1.17 m)
- Doors: Bi-parting sliding
- Wheelbase: 49 ft 0 in (14.94 m) (bogie centres, per car)
- Maximum speed: 70 mph (110 km/h)
- Weight: 41 long tons (42 t; 46 short tons) (DMBS); 24 long tons (24 t; 27 short tons) (TS); 24 long tons (24 t; 27 short tons) (TC); 25 long tons (25 t; 28 short tons) (DTC)
- Traction motors: 4 × EE
- Power output: 4 × 235 hp (175 kW)/ traction motor total 940 hp (700 kW)
- HVAC: Electric
- Electric system: 630 V DC Third rail
- Current collection: Contact shoe
- UIC classification: Bo′Bo′+2′2′+2′2′ Bo′Bo′+2′2′
- Braking system: Air (EP)
- Coupling system: Screw
- Multiple working: Within type
- Track gauge: 1,435 mm (4 ft 8 1/2 in) standard gauge

The British Rail Class 502 was a type of electric multiple-unit passenger train, originally built by the London, Midland and Scottish Railway at its Derby Works. Introduced in 1940 and withdrawn by 1980, they spent the whole of their working lives on the electrified railway lines north of Liverpool.

The trains were designed to replace older electric trains built by the Lancashire and Yorkshire Railway on the lines from Liverpool Exchange railway station to Southport and Ormskirk. These lines were electrified with a direct current (DC) third rail. The Class 502s entered service between 1940 and 1943. They were DC-only and operated as both three-car and two-car sets, which could be coupled together to form five-car or six-car sets for use on the busier services.

== Design ==
A very modern design for the time, they were equipped with air-operated sliding doors. They were similar to (but somewhat larger than) the Class 503s operating in Wirral, being both longer and wider, allowing 3+2 seating on the Southport 502s compared to 2+2 seating on the Wirral 503s. In addition the 502s had distinctive large resistance cooling grids mounted on top of the cab roof of the motor units. Virtually all electric suburban passenger trains in Great Britain now follow the basic layout pioneered by the Class 502s and 503s, with two sets of double-leaf air operated sliding doors on each side of each carriage.

== Build ==
Unlike the Wirral Class 503s, which were built by contractors familiar with this type of layout on London Underground trains, the 502s which followed shortly afterwards were built by the LMS's own workshops in Derby. The 502s had conventional railway buffers at the end of each set, as they did a considerable amount of interworking with steam and later diesel services, whereas the 503s in Wirral had automatic Buckeye couplers and no buffers, as they did very little inter-running with services from outside. The Class 502s were considerably more powerful than their Wirral counterparts, having four 235 hp (175 kW) traction motors.

== Interiors ==
The interiors of the Class 502s contained varnished wood, tungsten lighting and deep-sprung seating. Apart from the construction differences with the Class 503s, both types of train were given heavy overhauls at Horwich works, and the common red/black/grey seat moquette, and grey paint used on the interiors, plus other common details, gave them a considerable air of similarity.

== Route changes ==
Liverpool Exchange station closed in 1977, being replaced by new underground stations at Moorfields and Liverpool Central as part of the Northern Line of the Merseyrail network. The electrification was also extended to Kirkby, on the Wigan line, to the north-east of the city and Garston, to the south-east, using Class 502s. The units struggled to cope with the challenging gradients in the new underground sections, which are as steep as 1 in 30 in places, and their reliability suffered.

== Depots ==
The principal depot was in Southport, on the Preston / Manchester lines at Meols Cop. In the mid-20th century there was a triangle, and the works were situated in the middle. The Preston line closed in the mid-1960s, and the electrified lines from Southport to Meols Cop remained for a further six years, to enable the Merseyrail 502 stock to reach the depot under their own power. Meols Cop closed in 1970. Servicing was then continued at Birkenhead North depot.

Hall Road also had a maintenance depot, which conducted minor repairs, and sidings to the north of station; and at the side of the depot. Stabling points were also situated outside Southport Chapel Street station and at Bank Hall, to the west of the four live running tracks. The Bank Hall stabling point fell into disuse prior to the Loop and Link extensions of the 1970s and was replaced by Kirkdale depot in 1976.

== Numbering ==
British Railways numbers were:

- Driving Motor Brake Second, M28311M-M28369M
- Trailer Second, M29545M-M29594M
- Trailer Second (built as Trailer Composite), M29812M-M29820M
- Driving Trailer Composite, M29866M-M29899M

== Formation ==
These formed, notionally, 34 3-car units Motor-Trailer-Driving Trailer, and 25 2-car units Motor-Trailer. The 2-car units only had a driving cab at one end and could not be operated on their own, only coupled to one of the 3-car units, which was an unusual feature of this stock. It was normal to form the main 5-car sets with the motor cars at the outer ends of the formation, and the trailer coupled to the driving trailer in the centre. The 6-car sets were formed with motor cars at the outer ends of the formation with the driving trailers coupled together in the centre.

There were a number of different formations used, but 5-car sets were usual on the main Southport and Ormskirk routes, with a couple of the busiest peak trains being 6-car, formed of two three-car units coupled together. The Crossens shuttle was a 3-car unit, or a specially formed Motor-Driving Trailer 2-car unit.

As initially built there was considerable overprovision of first class accommodation, which usually ran virtually empty on these routes. This is an issue seen on some other suburban routes as well. Composite trailers 29812 to 29817 were converted to all-second in 1950 and renumbered. The remaining 3 composite trailers (29818 to 29820) and 29814 were converted to driving composites trailers, with a new cab constructed to match the original 1939 to 1941 design. These conversions allowed more three car units to be formed allowing for greater operational flexibility. The leading saloon of the driving composite trailers was downrated to second class non-smoking in the late 1960s. This saloon was the first class non-smoking section. An additional full width partition, with door, was built across the middle saloon so that approximately one third of this saloon (cab end) became the non-smoking first class section. First class provision was finally withdrawn on these routes in the early 1970s.

== Livery ==
The units were painted various colours over the years. When initially built in 1939, they were the standard LMS maroon red. After railway nationalisation in the late 1940s units were repainted in light malachite green and further repainting from the 1950s to the standard BR dark green for EMUs. Towards the end of their green days, the units gained yellow warning panels on cab ends. When BR changed their liveries in the mid-1960s the units were repainted plain Rail Blue, continuing with the small yellow warning panel and eventually gaining full yellow ends, the white 'double arrow' British Rail symbol was carried on the DMBS only, continuing the tradition of the green livery of only carrying the BRITISH RAILWAYS symbols on motor coaches. First class lining and '1' numerals appeared on the bodyside next to the middle saloon of driving trailer composites, this was removed when the units were downrated to all second on 3 May, 1971 and 'Merseyrail' branding appeared on the centre lower body panels of all coaches with the formation of the passenger transport executive shortly after. Towards the end of their life, in the late 1970s, they were repainted again in their first two-tone livery, the standard blue and grey, in which scheme they were withdrawn. Following withdrawal, two reinstated departmental units were repainted with wasp stripes on the cab ends.

== Withdrawal and preservation ==
=== Withdrawal ===
Units started being withdrawn from 1950. From 1978, new Class 507 units began to arrive on the network and the 502s, which by now were considered life-expired, were gradually withdrawn. The final regular passenger service was on 1 September 1980, with a farewell tour five days later. The last set was withdrawn in November 1980. Two DMBS cars were reinstated in 1981 for departmental duties, and allocated to Hall Road. The departmental units were renumbered from M28354 and M28357 to ADB977017 and ADB977018, respectively, and kept at Kirkdale until 1986. All cars, except for one two-car set, were scrapped.

=== Preservation ===
A two-car set (driving motor 28361 and driving trailer 29896) was claimed for preservation by the National Railway Museum. For many years the unit was kept at the Steamport centre in Southport, where it was restored to original LMS condition, complete with maroon livery. It operated occasional special services on the Merseyrail electric network for several years in the 1980s. However, when Steamport closed, the NRM were unable to find an alternative location to display it, and relocated the unit to remote storage at MoD Kineton.

In early 2007, it was suggested that the NRM was considering disposing of this unit as it no longer featured as part of its long-term plans. In response, a new preservation group (The Friends of the 502) was formed, with the aim of taking over responsibility for the unit's upkeep. In May 2009 the unit was moved by road to a private site in Tebay, Cumbria. In March 2012, following re-development of the site, the unit was moved to the base of the Merseyside Transport Trust in Burscough, Lancashire. This move means that the unit is under cover for the first time in 15 years.
