= Midland Railway Carriage and Wagon Company =

British rolling stock manufacturer

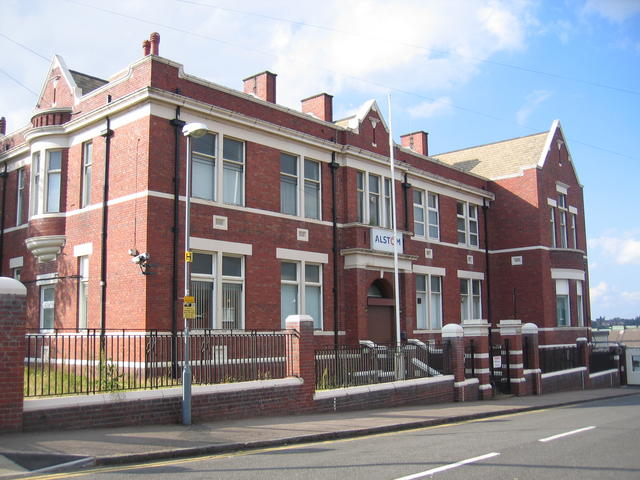
Metro Cammell Carriage and Wagon Works Main Office Block, Leigh Road, Washwood Heath, Birmingham

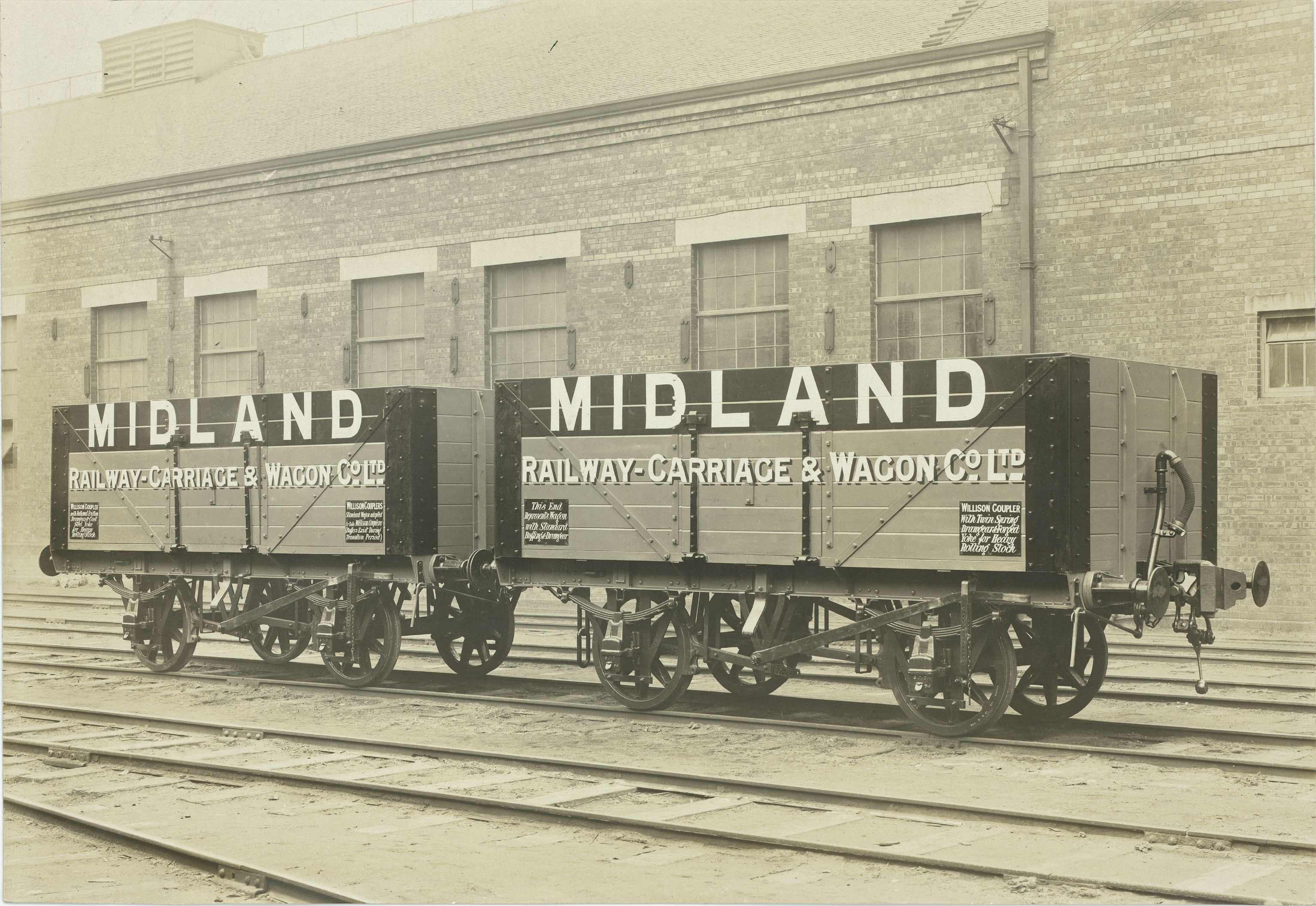
Wagons as samples with their own labelling

The Midland Railway Carriage and Wagon Company was a Birmingham, England, based manufacturer of railway carriages and wagons. It was not part of the Midland Railway.

Its products also included trams and even military tanks.

It has made trains for railways in the UK and overseas, including the London Underground.

After a series of takeovers, its works at Washwood Heath in Birmingham became part of Metro Cammell and are now part of the Alstom group.

== History ==
In 1845, Joseph Wright, a London coach builder, leased land in Saltley, Birmingham with the intention of building a factory for the production of railway rolling stock. Wright, realising that the future lay in the development of the railways devoted his energies, together with those of his sons to building rolling stock and by the 1850s his Saltley site had massively expanded and he was employing a work force of about 800 people. In addition to building stock for practically all the British railways, the firm completed contracts for many countries world-wide. They also had premises in Shrewsbury.

In 1902 rationalisation of the rolling stock industry began when the Metropolitan Amalgamated Railway Carriage and Wagon Co. Ltd. was formed, incorporating Joseph Wright's old firm with other well known companies such as Ashbury, Brown and Marshalls, Oldbury and Lancaster railway carriage companies. In 1929 Vickers, after acquiring the shares of the Metropolitan Company, came together with Cammell Laird and each merged their rolling stock interests to form the great undertaking of Metropolitan-Cammell Ltd.
