= London Buses route 205 =

London bus route

205
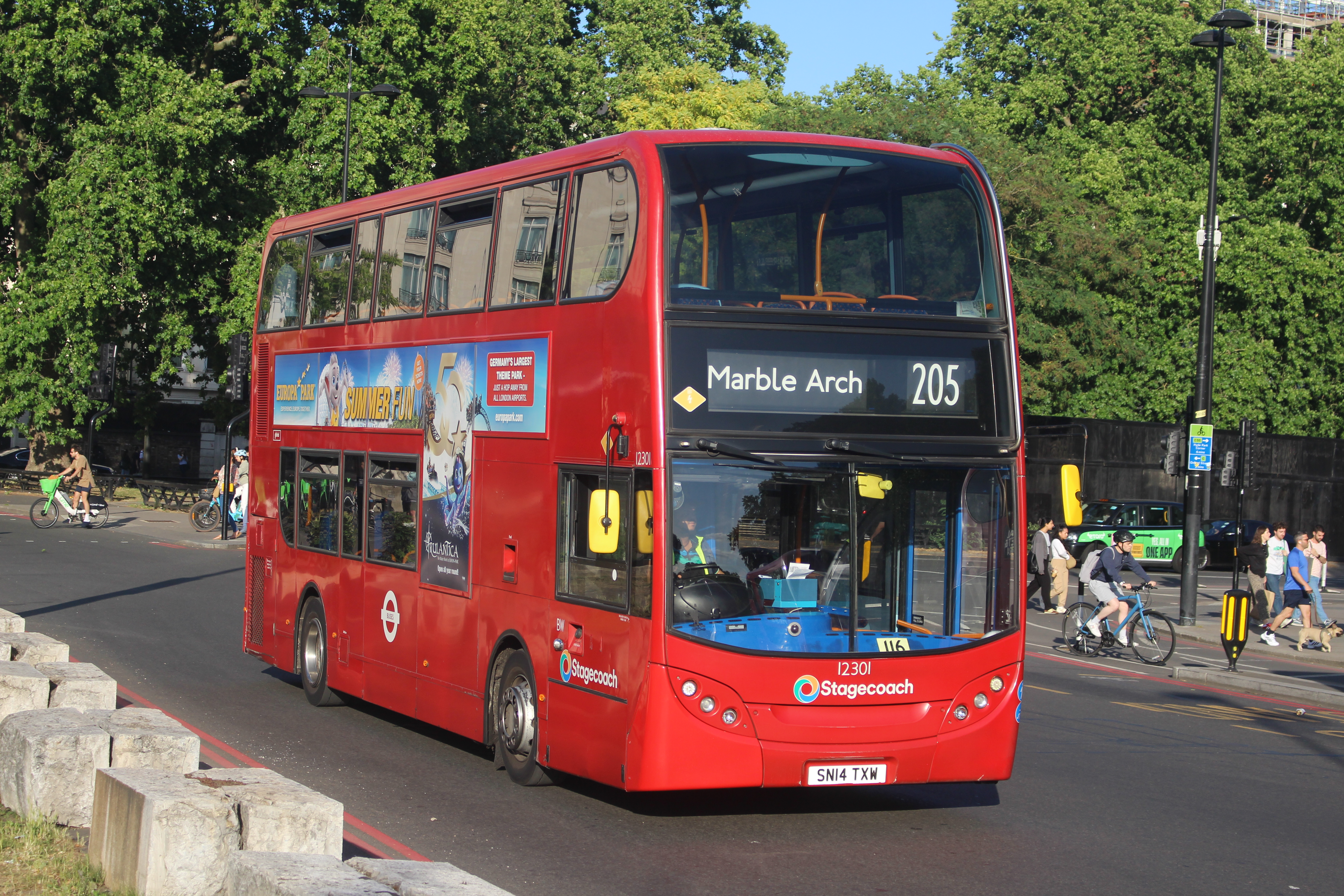
- East London Alexander Dennis Enviro400H at Marble Arch in June 2025

Overview
- Operator: East London (Stagecoach London)
- Garage: Bow
- Vehicle: Wright StreetDeck Electroliner
- Peak vehicle requirement: 21
- Night-time: Night Bus N205

Route
- Start: Bow Church
- Via: Mile End; Aldgate; Islington; Euston
- End: Marble Arch station
- Length: 9 miles (14 km)

Service
- Level: Daily
- Frequency: About every 10-12 minutes
- Journey time: 50-87 minutes
- Operates: 04:56 until 01:28

London Buses route 205 is a Transport for London contracted bus route in London, England. Running between Bow Church and Marble Arch station, it is operated by Stagecoach London subsidiary East London.

2015 statistics from Transport for London stated that this route was responsible for the most injuries to cyclists of any TfL bus route in London.

== History ==
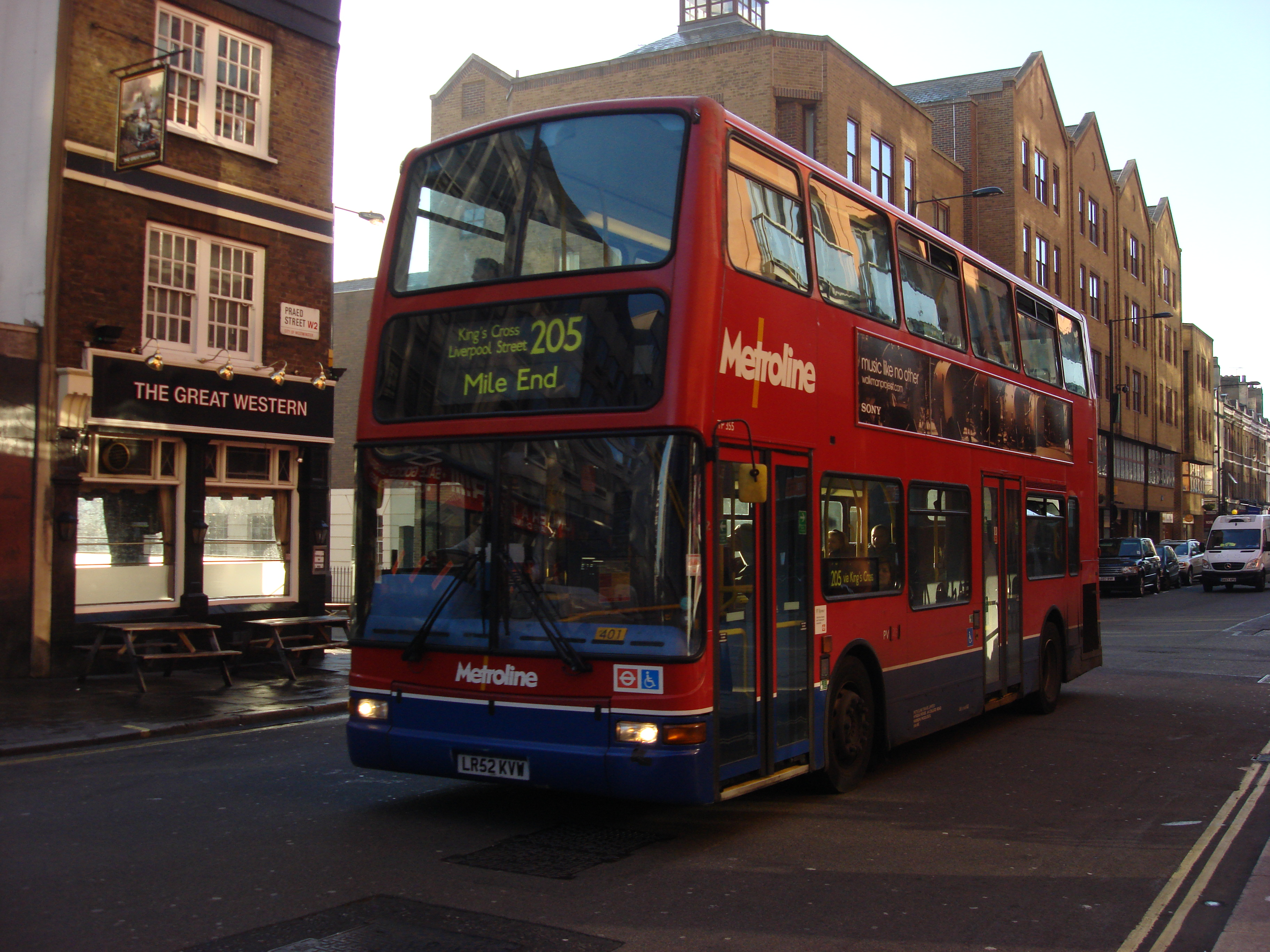
Metroline Plaxton President bodied Dennis Trident 2 on Praed Street in December 2007

Route 205 commenced operating on 31 August 2002, replacing the former Stationlink SL1 service, which had begun as an accessible route called Carelink for disabled people operated by National Bus Company owned Beeline. This route was withdrawn in 1988, and it became a London Transport contracted route. It was initially operated by London General, but in 1992 the contract was won by Thorpes. For a short period the route continued to be branded as Stationlink.

Route 205 was introduced as part improvements in preparation for the introduction of London congestion charge in February 2003. It connected Paddington, Marylebone, Euston, King's Cross and Liverpool Street termini stations, as well as many London Underground stations following the northern part of the Circle line. A route 705, linking stations on the southern section of the Circle Line, was also created but later withdrawn. The contract to operate the new route was won by Metroline.

It was extended from Whitechapel to Mile End tube station on 16 June 2007, and was converted into 24-hour service at the same time. Seven new Scania N230UDs arrived in summer 2007 to increase the frequency of the route.

Upon being re-tendered, on 29 August 2009 the route passed to East London. At the same time the route was extended further east, from Mile End to Bow Church. The contract required 25 new buses.

On 31 August 2013, the night service on this 24 hour route was withdrawn and replaced by night bus route N205, the existing night-time services on the 205 was simply re-numbered as N205 and extended to Leyton, Downsell Road via Stratford.

Upon being re-tendered the route was retained by East London with a new contract to commence on 30 August 2014 with new Alexander Dennis Enviro400Hs.

In 2018, Transport for London consulted on reducing the frequency of the route.

In October 2024, Transport for London opened a public consultation proposing to modify the route to terminate at Marble Arch station instead of Paddington station to replace route 30. In May 2025, it was confirmed that the changes would proceed and they were implemented on 21 June 2025.

== Current route ==
Route 205 operates via these primary locations:

- Bow Church
- Bow Road station
- Mile End station
- Stepney Green station
- Royal London Hospital
- Whitechapel station
- Aldgate East station
- Liverpool Street station
- Shoreditch High Street station
- Old Street station
- Moorfields Eye Hospital
- Islington Angel
- King's Cross station
- St Pancras International station
- Euston bus station for Euston station
- Euston Square station
- Great Portland Street station
- Regent's Park station
- Baker Street station
- Marble Arch station
