= Bromley-by-Bow tube station =

London Underground station

Bromley-by-Bow
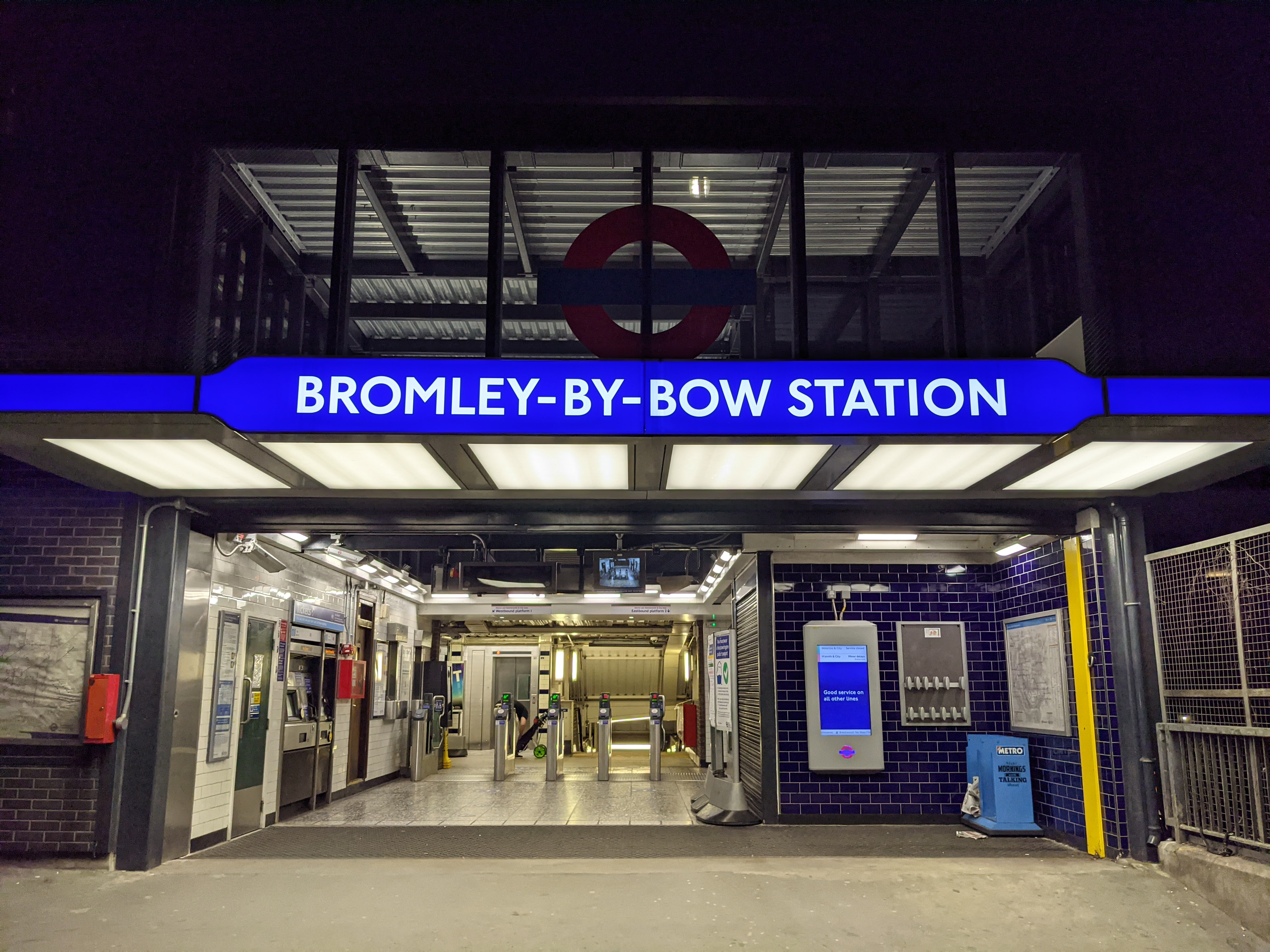
- Station entrance

General information
- Location: Bromley-by-Bow, Tower Hamlets
- Coordinates: 51°31′26″N 0°00′41″W
- Owner: Transport for London
- Manager: London Underground
- Platforms: 2

Construction
- Accessible: Yes

Other information
- Fare zone: 2 and 3
- Website: Official website

History
- Opened: 31 March 1858
- Former names: Bromley (1858–1967)
- Original company: London, Tilbury and Southend Railway
- Pre-grouping: Midland Railway
- Post-grouping: London, Midland and Scottish Railway

Key dates
- 1 March 1894: Rebuilt and relocated platforms
- 2 June 1902: District line started
- 1 January 1948: Ownership transferred to British Railways
- 14 June 1962: London–Southend withdrawn
- 1 January 1969: Ownership transferred to London Transport

Passengers

London Underground annual entry and exit
- 2021: ▼2.03 million
- 2022: ▲3.43 million
- 2023: ▲3.73 million
- 2024: ▲3.76 million
- 2025: ▲3.81 million
Location
- Location in Tower Hamlets

Bromley-by-Bow (/ˈbrɒmli baɪ ˈboʊ/) is a London Underground station located on the Blackwall Tunnel Northern Approach in the Bromley-by-Bow neighbourhood of the London Borough of Tower Hamlets, East London. It is on the District and Hammersmith & City lines, between Bow Road to the west and West Ham to the east.

The station was opened as "Bromley" by the London, Tilbury and Southend Railway on 31 March 1858 on a new more direct route from Fenchurch Street to Barking. It was rebuilt to accommodate the electric District Railway services on an additional set of tracks in 1905. In the late 19th and early 20th centuries the station was served by Great Eastern Railway and North London Railway trains. Metropolitan line service commenced in 1936. The Fenchurch Street–Southend British Railways service was withdrawn in 1962, leaving abandoned platforms. The station was renamed Bromley-by-Bow in 1967. It is in London fare zones 2 and 3.

== History ==
The London, Tilbury and Southend Railway (LTSR) direct line between Bow and Barking was constructed through the parish of Bromley with service starting on 31 March 1858. Prior to the building of the line, trains took a longer and more congested route via Stratford and Forest Gate. The new line initially had stations at Bromley, Plaistow and East Ham. The station building and the two platforms were located to the east of St Leonard's Street. Great Eastern Railway (GER) services from Fenchurch Street to North Woolwich started calling at Bromley from 1883. (Note: GER trains initially did not stop at Bromley. They called there from 1883 until 1887 and again from 1891.) From 18 May 1869, Bromley was served by North London Railway (NLR) services to Plaistow. (Note: The western terminus was Chalk Farm from 18 May 1869, Bow from 1 October 1871, Chalk Farm from 1 June 1877 and Bow from 1 February 1878.) The station building was damaged by fire in December 1892. The LTSR was already making plans to relocate the platforms to the west of St Leonard's Street and to replace the station building, still on the east side of the road. This was brought forward and the new station opened on 1 March 1894, with a second entrance to Devons Road opening soon after. The site of the old platforms opened up land for a goods yard with access to the River Lea.

The Whitechapel and Bow Railway opened on 2 June 1902 and allowed through services of the District Railway to operate to Upminster. Service began at Bromley on 2 June 1902. The District Railway was electrified over a second pair of tracks, with electric service operating from 30 September 1905. The District provided the majority of services at the station by 1912. The LTSR was purchased by the Midland Railway (MR) in 1912. The NLR Plaistow services were withdrawn on 1 January 1916. The MR was amalgamated into the London, Midland and Scottish Railway (LMS) on 1 January 1923. The District Railway was incorporated into London Transport in 1933, and became known as the District line.

The eastern section of the District line was very overcrowded by the mid 1930s. In order to relieve this, the Metropolitan line service was extended to Barking. (Note: This was achieved by diverting Metropolitan line trains that had previously been routed onto the East London Line at Whitechapel.) Bromley was served by a single daily Metropolitan line train from Hammersmith from 30 March 1936. This was expanded from 4 May 1936 with an eight trains per hour service between Barking and Hammersmith at peak times. This was increased to ten trains per hour at Bromley from 8 May 1938. (Note: The two extra trains terminated at East Ham.) The Hammersmith service was swapped for longer Uxbridge trains from 17 July 1939, at eight trains per hour at peak times. This service was suspended on 6 October 1941 with Hammersmith trains again running to Barking. GER services to North Woolwich, still operating at the outbreak of World War II in 1939, were suspended and were not restored.

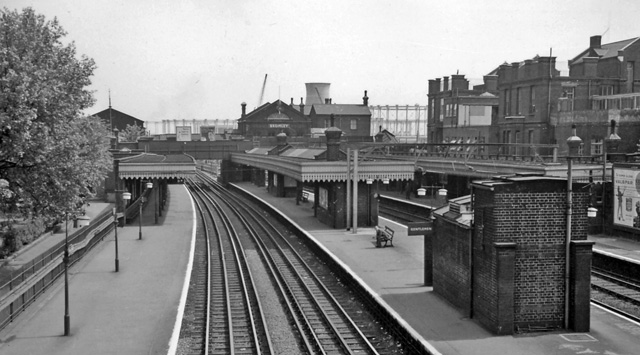
Looking east in 1961, the station layout is largely unchanged since 1905

After nationalisation of the railways in 1948, management of the station passed to British Railways. The Fenchurch Street–Southend services were withdrawn on 14 June 1962 with the introduction of full overhead line electric service. The station was renamed to Bromley-by-Bow on 18 May 1967. (Note: Speculated by Connor to avoid confusion with stations in the London Borough of Bromley.) On 1 January 1969 ownership transferred to the London Underground. The 1894 main station building was damaged by fire on 20 February 1970. The replacement building opened on 11 June 1972 on the opposite side of the road, which had been widened by the Greater London Council as the East Cross Route. The second entrance on Devons Road closed on 26 April 1970.

On 30 July 1990, the Hammersmith–Barking service of the Metropolitan line gained a separate identity as the Hammersmith & City line. On 2 June 2008, an unexploded bomb from World War II was found to the northeast of the station, causing disruption to trains. From 13 December 2009, off-peak Hammersmith & City line service was extended from Whitechapel to Barking with a daily all-day service at Bromley-by-Bow. Funded by Tower Hamlets Council and the London Legacy Development Corporation, lifts providing step-free access to the platforms became operational in March 2018 and the station building was modernised with works completed in 2019.

== Design ==
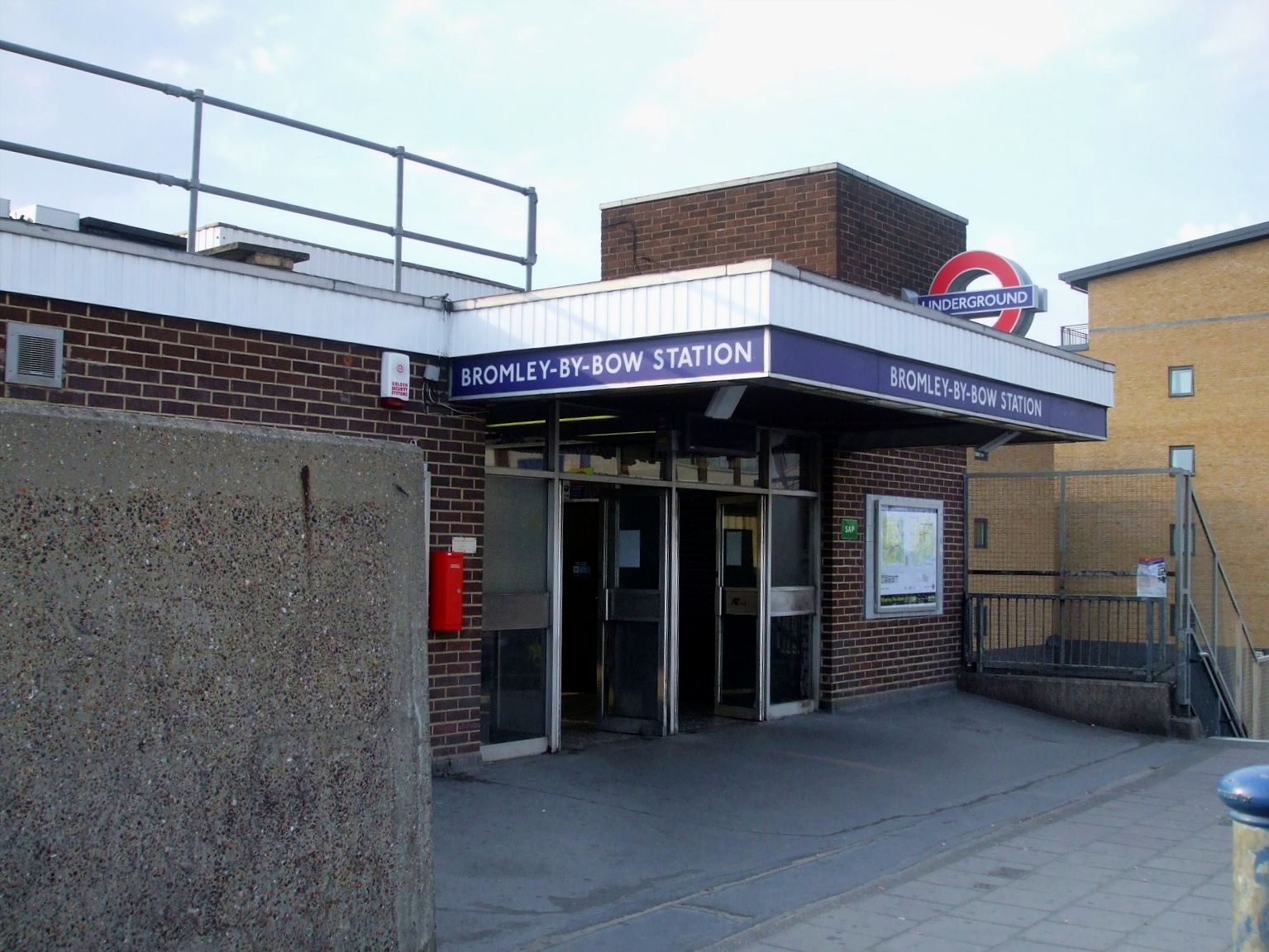
The 1972 station building prior to modernisation

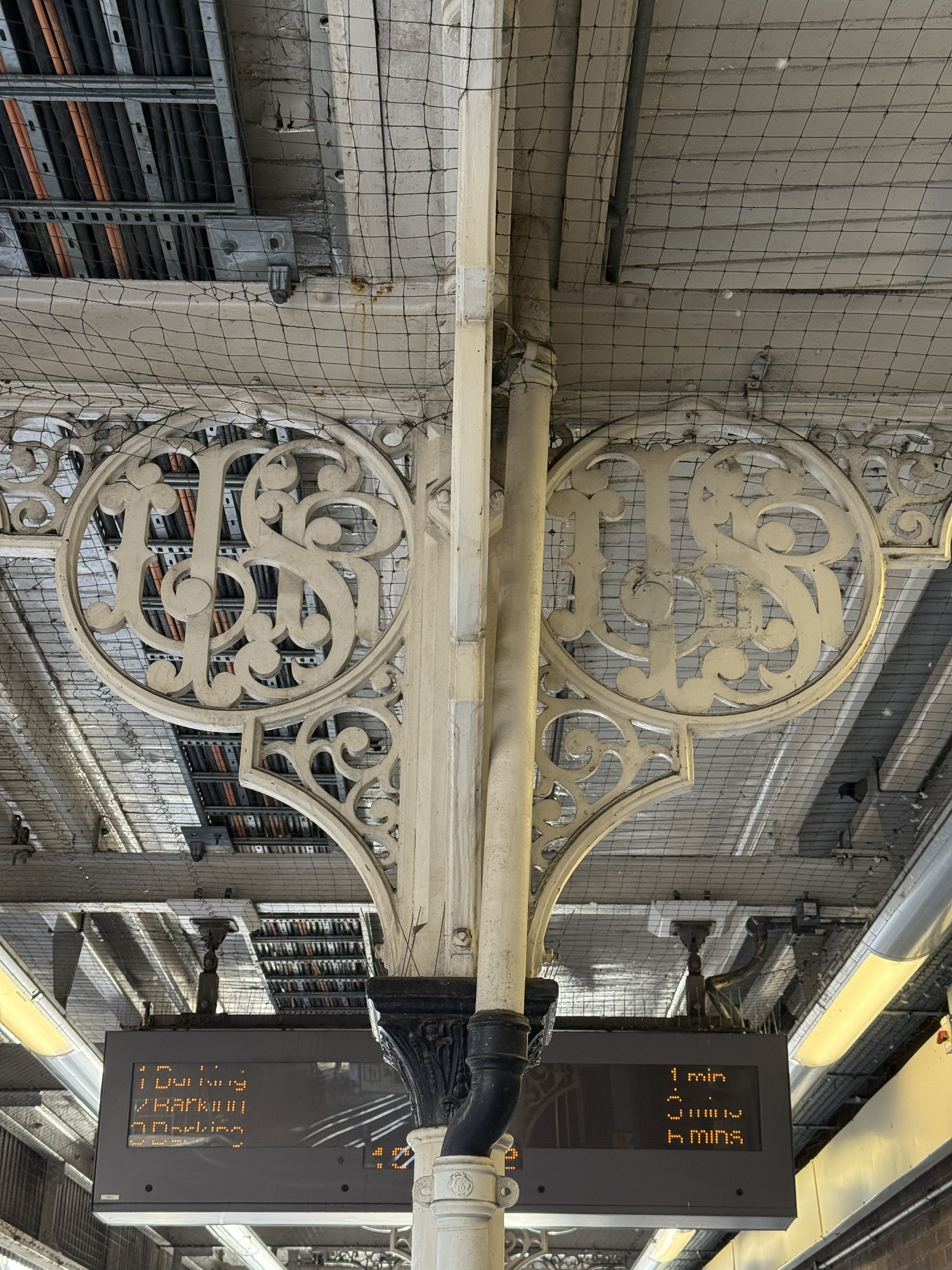
'LTSR' detail canopy supports on the eastbound platform

The station consists of two operational platforms on an east–west alignment. Platform 2, the northernmost, is for eastbound service. Platform 1 is for westbound service. The disused platforms of the Fenchurch Street to Southend services are to the south of the operational platforms. A short section of eastbound platform canopy with 'LTSR' detail on the supports from the 1894 rebuild was moved from the earlier down platform in 1905. The main station building on a raft over the tracks and the covered footbridge from 1972 were built by the London Transport Executive. Dark bricks were used, similar to those found on the new stations of the Victoria line. The 2019 modernisation by Hawkins\Brown included the addition of a double-height glazed atrium to the main station building, with a large roundel facing the road (since replaced with glass panels without the roundel due to vandalism). It follows the post-2015 London Underground design palette of blue, black, white and grey.

== Location ==
The station is located on Blackwall Tunnel Northern Approach in the Bromley-by-Bow neighbourhood of the London Borough of Tower Hamlets. It is served by London Buses routes 323, 488 and D8.

West Ham is 1.37 km (0.85 miles) to the east of the station and Bow Road is 1.01 km (0.63 miles) to the west. It is 5.23 km (3.25 miles) along the line from Tower Hill in Central London and 19.45 km (12.09 miles) from the eastern terminus at Upminster.

== Services ==
The station is managed by London Underground. It is in London fare zones 2 and 3. The typical off-peak service from the station is twelve District line trains per hour to Upminster with a further three trains to Barking. There are fifteen trains westbound to Earl's Court, of which six continue to Ealing Broadway, six continue to Richmond and three to Wimbledon. At peak periods the number of trains per hour increases. There are six Hammersmith & City line trains an hour to Barking and six to Hammersmith at all times.

Services towards central London operate from approximately 05:15 to 00:15 and services to Upminster operate from approximately 05:45 to 01:00. The journey time to Upminster is approximately 28 minutes, to Barking 11 minutes and to Tower Hill in central London 12 minutes. With 3.81 million entries and exits in 2025, it was ranked 155th busiest London Underground station.

Preceding station	London Underground	Following station
Bow Road towards Hammersmith	Hammersmith & City line	West Ham towards Barking
Bow Road towards Wimbledon, Richmond or Ealing Broadway	District line	West Ham towards Upminster
Former services
Burdett Road	Great Eastern Railway; Fenchurch Street–North Woolwich	Canning Town
Bow	North London Railway; Bow–Plaistow	West Ham
Stepney East	Eastern Region of British Railways; London, Tilbury and Southend	Plaistow

== In popular culture ==
In the BBC soap opera EastEnders the fictional Walford East tube station takes the place of Bromley-by-Bow on the version of the Tube map shown on the programme.
