= Whitechapel and Bow Railway =

Railway line in London, England

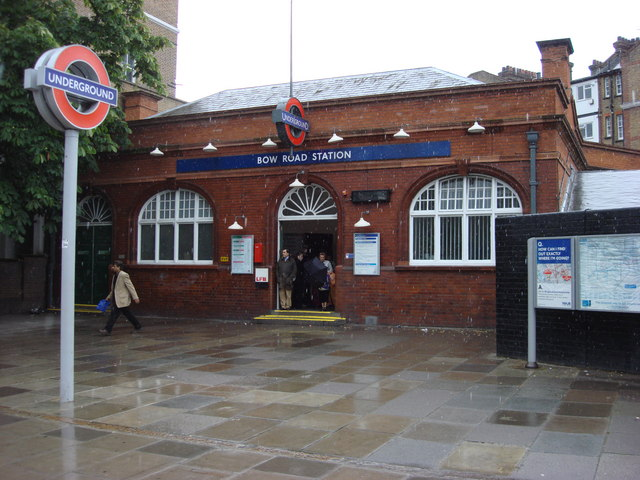
- Bow Road Stepney Green

Overview
- Status: Part of London Underground
- Owner: District Railway and London, Tilbury and Southend Railway and successors
- Locale: London, England
- Stations: 4

Service
- Type: Rapid transit

History
- Opened: 2 June 1902

Technical
- Number of tracks: 2
- Character: Sub-surface
- Track gauge: 1,435 mm (4 ft 8 1/2 in) standard gauge

The Whitechapel and Bow Railway (W&BR) was an underground railway in London, England, that is now entirely integrated into the London Underground system. The railway has its origins in a failed 1883 scheme to connect the sub-surface Metropolitan Railway (the Met) in the west with the above-ground London, Tilbury and Southend Railway (LTSR) in the east. The scheme was revived in 1897, this time with the District Railway (DR) as the western sub-surface partner. The short 2-mile (3.2 km) line allowed the DR to access suburban traffic and relieved pressure on LTSR services.

The railway opened on 2 June 1902. Three new stations were opened with the line. The railway was built to accommodate steam trains, which were eliminated following the introduction of fourth-rail electrification in 1905. It was run by a joint committee until 1920 and then by the DR on behalf of the joint owners. The railway made it possible to run through trains from Ealing Broadway to Southend-on-Sea from 1910 to 1939. Ownership was fully transferred to the London Transport Executive in January 1950 as part of the Transport Act 1947 provisions. It now carries the London Underground District and Hammersmith & City lines.

== History ==
=== Origins ===
The railway had its origins in a scheme promoted by the Metropolitan Railway (the Met), under chairman Edward Watkin, to connect St Mary's station in Whitechapel with the London, Tilbury and Southend Railway (LTSR) at Campbell Road in Bromley via underground railway. The purpose of the proposed line was to relieve pressure on the LTSR terminus at Fenchurch Street by routing local trains onto the Met. The Met and LTSR agreed to jointly promote the scheme in 1883. The route trains would take to reach the Met avoided Whitechapel station and 850 yards of track that were both exclusively owned by the District Railway (DR). (Note: Formally known as the Metropolitan District Railway.) However, trains would still need to pass through a section of the Metropolitan and Metropolitan District Joint Railway. The DR was able to block Metropolitan/LTSR through services on this basis and chairman James Staats Forbes made clear his intention to oppose the necessary legislation for the new line. The LTSR withdrew from the partnership with the Met. In 1897 the DR revived the scheme, seeking permission from shareholders in February and receiving legislative consent in August. The DR scheme was identical, except trains would run to their Whitechapel station and the line would not avoid it. Further legislation in 1898 established a joint committee of the DR and LTSR. They agreed to jointly fund the new line and a third act in 1900 confirmed how it would be operated.

=== Construction ===
Short section of District Railway track at Whitechapel

286 people were displaced to build the railway. They were rehoused in 1901 in the Wellington Buildings flats that were constructed on Wellington Street. Whitechapel DR station (Note: There was also an adjacent Whitechapel East London Railway station.) was closed for reconstruction on 2 February 1902 and was transferred to W&BR ownership. The railway included a bridge over the East London Railway to the east of Whitechapel station. Most of the railway was in cut-and-cover tunnel under Whitechapel Road and Mile End Road. It passed under the Regent's Canal in a short section of bored tunnel. East of Bow Road, the railway inclined at 1 in 40 gradient to meet up with the LTSR. Signalling was provided by Saxby and Farmer to DR specifications. The 2-mile (3.2 km) line opened on 2 June 1902. It linked a short section of DR track to the west of Whitechapel station with the LTSR at the above-ground Campbell Road Junction at Bromley, to the west of Bromley station. 450-foot (140 m) long platforms were built to accommodate LTSR trains. The line from Whitechapel to Campbell Road Junction, and on to East Ham, was fully fourth-rail electrified on 20 August 1905.

=== Management ===
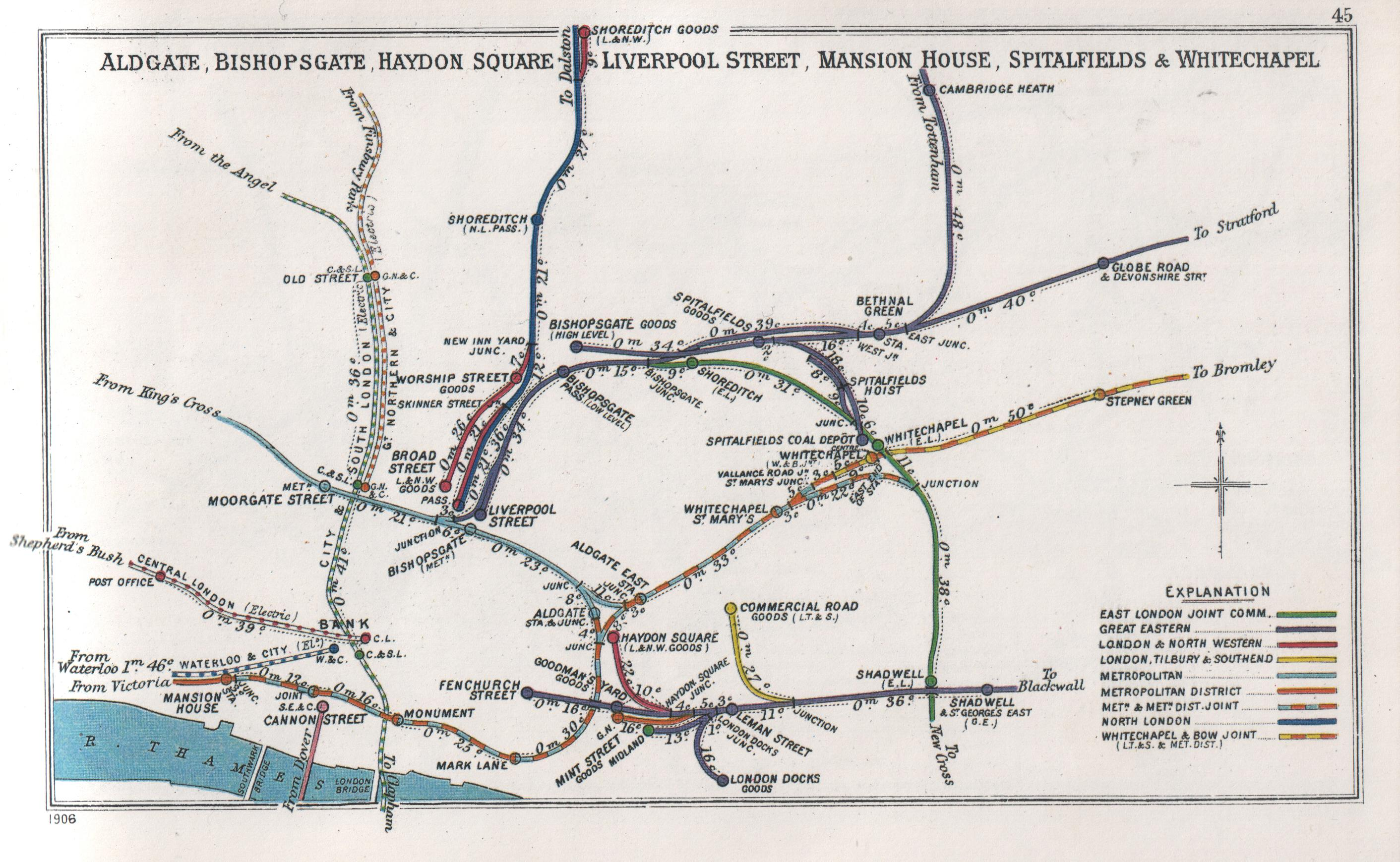
Railway Clearing House diagram of the Whitechapel area in 1906

From 1902 to 1950 the W&BR was owned as a joint venture. Initially the arrangement was between the DR and the LTSR. They formed a joint board, headquartered in the LTSR offices. The board consisted of three directors from each company and included the chairman of each of them. The line was initially operated by a joint committee. Both companies went through a series of amalgamations over time. The LTSR was purchased by the Midland Railway (MR) in 1912. In 1920 the joint committee was dissolved and thereafter the DR operated the line on behalf of the W&BR. The MR was subsequently grouped into the London, Midland and Scottish Railway (LMS) in 1923 and was nationalised in 1948 as part of British Railways. The DR was part of the Underground Electric Railways Company of London and was absorbed into the London Passenger Transport Board in 1933. This was nationalised as the London Transport Executive in 1948. Both the Railway Executive and the London Transport Executive were subsidiaries of the British Transport Commission. The Transport Act 1947 provided for complete ownership of the W&BR to pass to the London Transport Executive and this took place on 23 January 1950.

=== Services ===
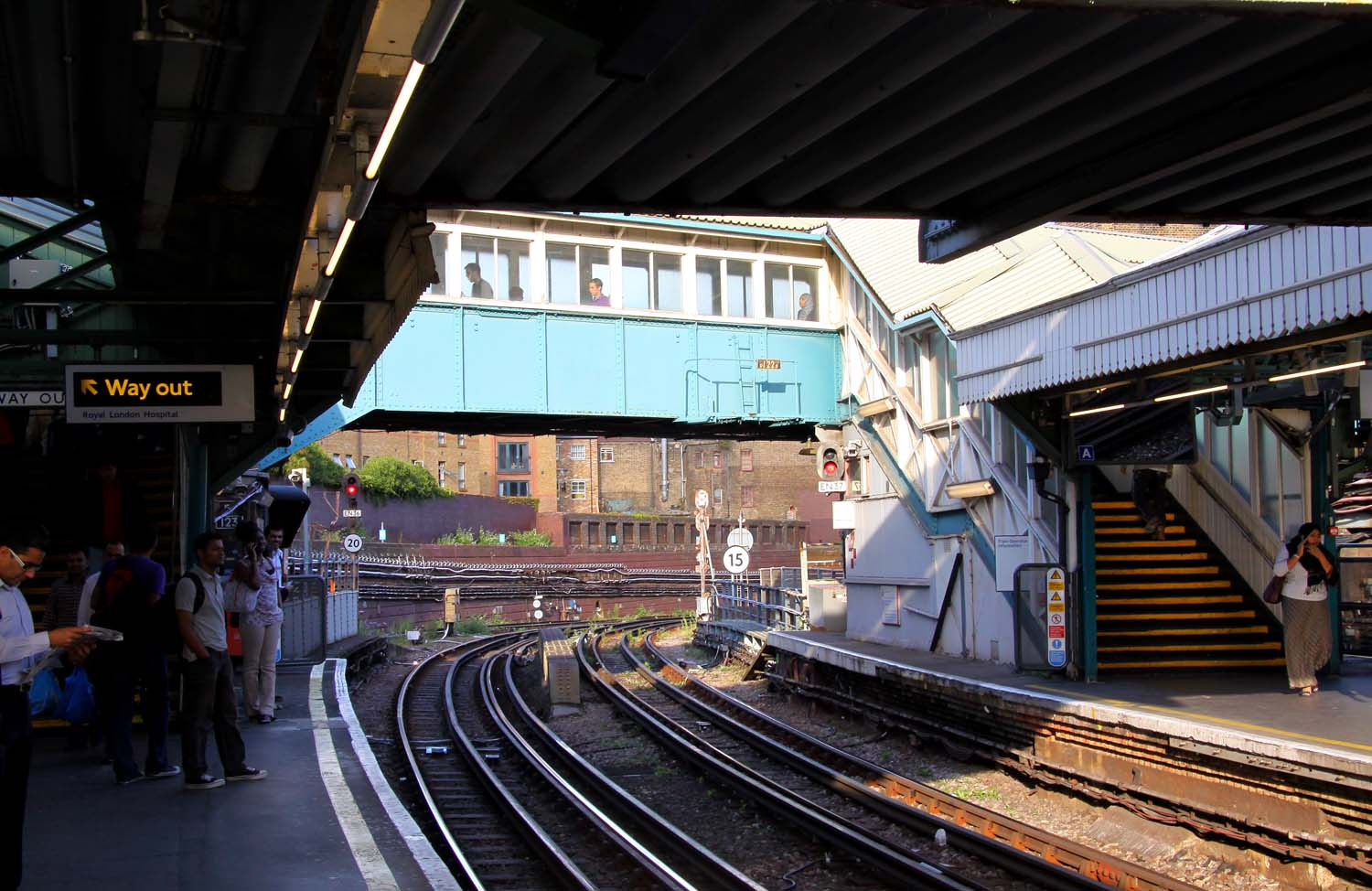
Whitechapel W&BR platforms and footbridge from the 1902 rebuild at the west end of the railway

The DR had running rights as far east as Bromley. Regular steam services to East Ham were provided by the DR with joint stock, (Note: Six trains were purchased, three by each company, to cover the extended service.) with some trains going as far as Upminster. After electrification, services terminated at East Ham from 30 September 1905 and Barking from 1 April 1908. The LTSR had running rights as far west as Whitechapel and operated a return Whitechapel to Southend steam service on Sundays during the summer of 1905. They were the only LTSR passenger services that ran on the W&BR. Failing to establish a suitable terminus, the LTSR gave up plans to run regular services over the W&BR to destinations west of Whitechapel in 1908.

Fares to Fenchurch Street via the LTSR and Mark Lane via the W&BR were the same and tickets were interchangeable. (Note: An arrangement maintained to the present day.) A regular jointly-operated Ealing Broadway to Southend through service was run daily from 1910 to 1939, with traction west of Barking provided by the DR's electric locomotives. The LMS extended the electrified local tracks east from Barking and electric DR trains reached Upminster on 12 September 1932. The Metropolitan line provided a peak time service from 1936, in effect finally realising the original Met/LTSR proposal. On 30 July 1990, the Metropolitan line service running over the Whitechapel and Bow section gained a separate identity as the Hammersmith & City line. From 13 December 2009, off-peak Hammersmith & City line service was extended from Whitechapel to Barking with a daily all-day service.

== Design ==
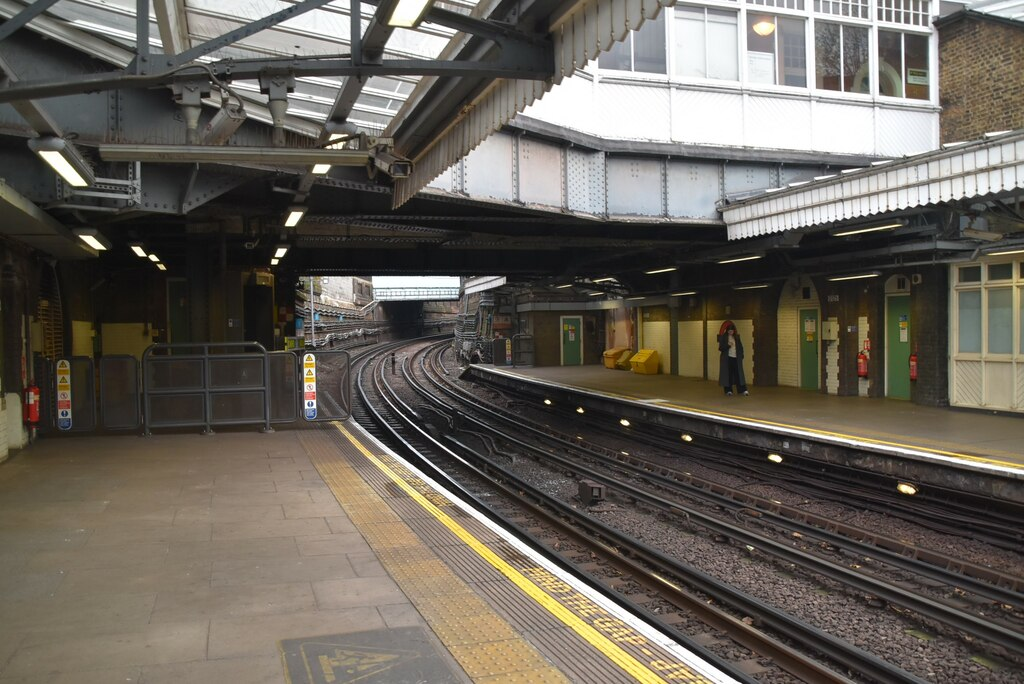
Tracks climb from Bow Road station at the east end of the railway

The stations were designed by the engineer Cuthbert Arthur Brereton. Stepney Green and Bow Road station buildings survive from 1902. Mile End station, that had been identical to Stepney Green, was rebuilt in 1945 as part of the eastern extension of the Central line. Bow Road station was built to a unique design because of the constrained site. The station building had half the frontage of the other two stations and has been a Grade II listed building since 27 September 1973. Station exteriors had brown glazed bricks below the windowsills and red brick above. The windows and doors had terracotta surrounds. The interiors had white glazed bricks. Platforms were 450 feet (140 m) long to accommodate longer LTSR trains. Underground platforms had vents for steam trains that were unnecessary after 1905. Brereton also designed the Wellington Buildings flats adjacent to Bow Road station.

== List of stations ==
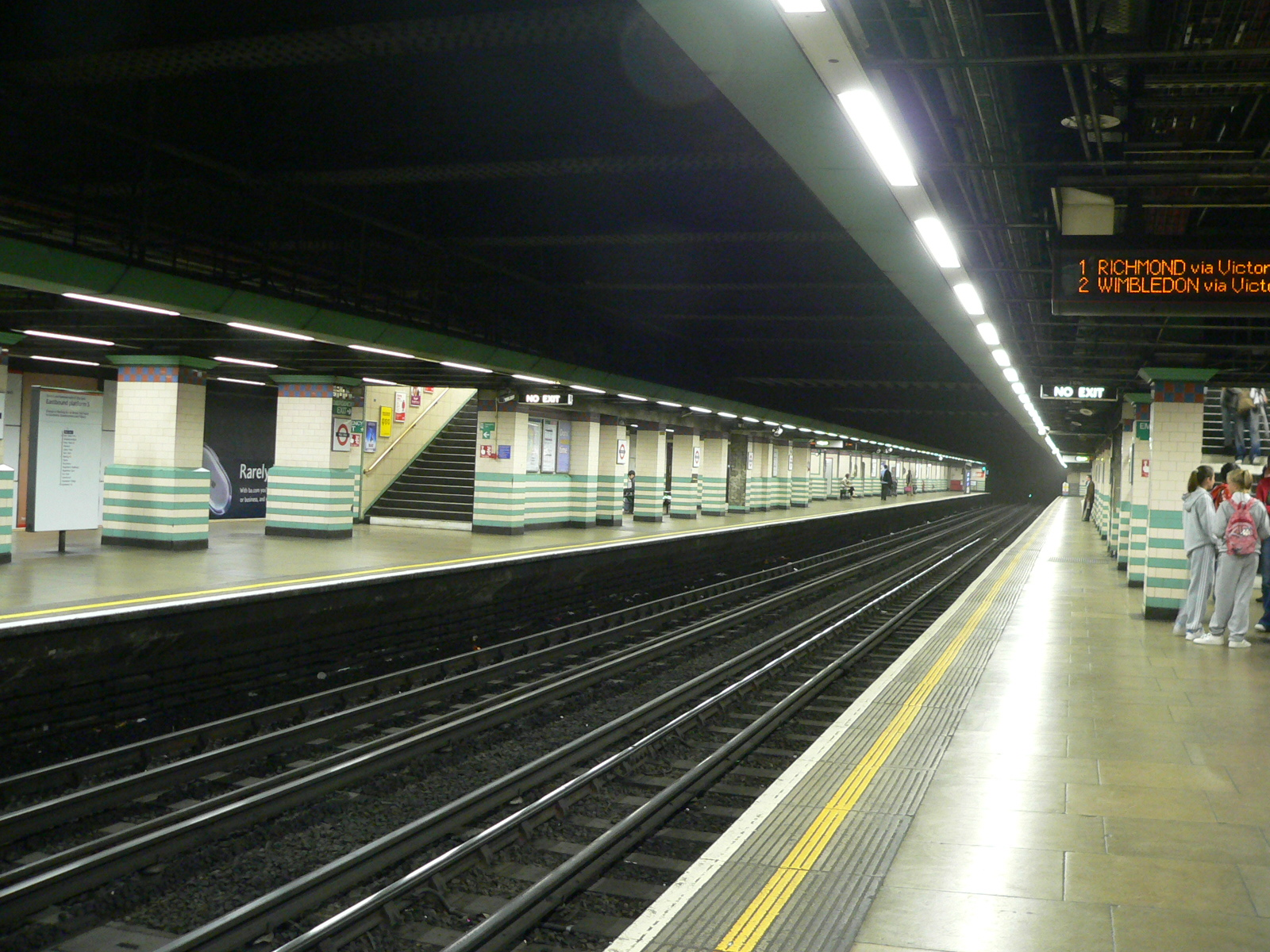
At Mile End the former W&BR platforms now have cross-platform interchange with the Central line

The stations were as follows:

Station	First served	Notes	References
Whitechapel	2 June 1902	Existing DR station, rebuilt and ownership transferred	
Stepney Green	23 June 1902	New station	
Mile End	2 June 1902	New station, planned to be named "Burdett Road"	
Bow Road	11 June 1902	New station, planned to be named "Wellington Road" and then "Bow"	
