= District Railway =

Former underground railway in London (1868–1933)

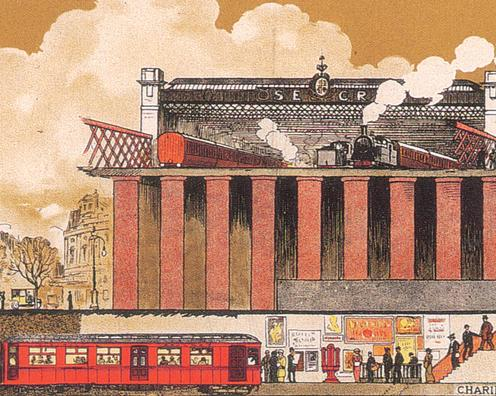
Part of a UERL poster from 1914 shows the underground District Railway Embankment station under the South Eastern and Chatham Railway's Charing Cross terminus

The Metropolitan District Railway, also known as the District Railway, was a passenger railway that served London, England, from 1868 to 1933. Established in 1864 to complete an "inner circle" of lines connecting railway termini in London, the first part of the line opened using gas-lit wooden carriages hauled by steam locomotives. The Metropolitan Railway operated all services until the District Railway introduced its own trains in 1871. The railway was soon extended westwards through Earl's Court to Fulham, Richmond, Ealing and Hounslow. After completing the inner circle and reaching Whitechapel in 1884, it was extended to Upminster in Essex in 1902.

To finance electrification at the beginning of the 20th century, American financier Charles Yerkes took it over and made it part of his Underground Electric Railways Company of London (UERL) group. Electric propulsion was introduced in 1905, and by the end of the year electric multiple units operated all of the services. On 1 July 1933, the District Railway and the other UERL railways were merged with the Metropolitan Railway and the capital's tramway and bus operators to form the London Passenger Transport Board.

Today, former District Railway tracks and stations are used by the London Underground's District, Piccadilly and Circle lines.

== History ==
=== Origins, 1863–1886 ===
==== Inner Circle ====
In 1863, the Metropolitan Railway (also known as the Met) opened the world's first underground railway. The line was built from Paddington beneath the New Road, connecting the main line railway termini at Paddington, Euston and King's Cross. Then it followed Farringdon Road to a station at Farringdon Street in Smithfield, near the capital's financial heart in the City.

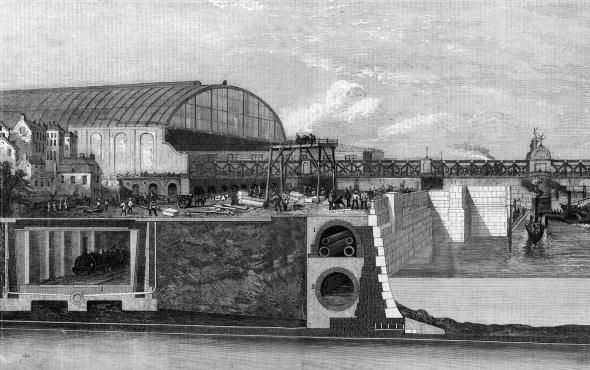
An 1867 drawing of the District Railway in the Embankment at Charing Cross station.

The Met's early success prompted a flurry of applications to Parliament in 1863 for new railways in London, many competing for similar routes. The House of Lords established a select committee that recommended an "inner circuit of railway that should abut, if not actually join, nearly all of the principal railway termini in the Metropolis". For the 1864 parliamentary session, railway schemes were presented that met the recommendation in varying ways and a joint committee composed of members of both Houses of Parliament reviewed the options. (Note: In November 1863, The Times reported that about 30 railway schemes for London had been submitted for consideration in the next parliamentary session. Many of which seemed "to have been prepared on the spur of the moment, without much consideration either as to the cost of construction or as to the practicability of working them when made.")

Metropolitan District Railways Act 1864
- Act of Parliament
- Parliament of the United Kingdom
- Long title: An Act for authorizing the Completion of an Inner Circle of Railways North of the Thames.
- Citation: 27 & 28 Vict. c. cccxxii

Dates
- Royal assent: 29 July 1864

Text of statute as originally enacted

Proposals to extend west and then south from Paddington to South Kensington and east from Moorgate to Tower Hill were accepted and received royal assent on 29 July 1864 in the Metropolitan Railway (Notting Hill and Brompton Extension) Act 1864 (27 & 28 Vict. c. ccxci) and the Metropolitan Railway (Tower Hill Extension) Act 1864 (27 & 28 Vict. c. cccxv) respectively. To complete the circuit, the committee encouraged the amalgamation of two other schemes proposed to run via different routes between Kensington and the City and a combined proposal under the name Metropolitan District Railway passed into law on the same day in the Metropolitan District Railways Act 1864 (27 & 28 Vict. c. cccxxii). Initially, the District and the Met were closely associated and it was intended that they would soon merge. The Met's chairman and three other directors were on the board of the District, John Fowler was the engineer of both companies and the construction works for all of the extensions were let as a single contract. The District was established as a separate company to enable funds to be raised independently of the Met.

Unlike the Metropolitan, the route did not follow an easy alignment under existing roads and land values were higher, so compensation payments for property were much higher. Major landowners, including Lord Kensington, sold parcels of land to the railway company. To ensure ventilation, the line west of Gloucester Road was carried in open cuttings, the rest mainly in a cut and cover tunnel 25 feet (7.6 m) wide and 15 feet 9 inches (4.80 m) deep; at the stations the platform ends were left open. Construction costs and compensation payments were so high that the cost of the first section of the District from South Kensington to Westminster was £3 million, almost three times the cost of the Met's original, longer line. On 24 December 1868, the District opened its line from South Kensington to Westminster, with stations at South Kensington, Sloane Square, Victoria, St James's Park and Westminster Bridge (now Westminster), the Met extending eastwards from Brompton to a shared station at South Kensington on the same day.

In 1871 the inner circle services began, starting from Mansion House and travelling to Moorgate Street via South Kensington and Paddington. The companies had their own pairs of track between Kensington High Street and South Kensington.

The District also had parliamentary permission to extend westward from Brompton (Gloucester Road) station and, on 12 April 1869, it opened a single track line from there to West Brompton on the West London Railway. There were no intermediate stations and this service initially operated as a shuttle. By summer 1869 additional tracks had been laid between South Kensington and Brompton (Gloucester Road) and from Kensington (High Street) to a junction with the line to West Brompton. During the night of 5 July 1870 the District secretly built the disputed Cromwell Curve connecting Brompton (Gloucester Road) and Kensington (High Street). East of Westminster, the next section ran in the newly constructed Victoria Embankment built by the Metropolitan Board of Works along the north bank of the River Thames. The line was opened from Westminster to Blackfriars on 30 May 1870 with stations at Charing Cross (now Embankment), The Temple (now Temple) and Blackfriars.

Metropolitan District Railway Act 1870
- Act of Parliament
- Parliament of the United Kingdom
- Long title: An Act to enable the Metropolitan District Railway Company to make a Station near Bread Street, and for other purposes with respect to the same Company.
- Citation: 33 & 34 Vict. c. xciv

Dates
- Royal assent: 4 July 1870

Text of statute as originally enacted

The Met initially operated all services, receiving 55 per cent of the gross receipts for a fixed level of service. The District were also charged for any extra trains and the District's share of the income dropped to about 40 per cent. The District's level of debt meant that merger was no longer attractive to the Met and its directors resigned from the District's board. To improve its finances, the District gave the Met notice to terminate the operating agreement. Struggling under the burden of high construction costs, the District was unable to continue with the original scheme to reach Tower Hill and made a final extension of its line one station further east from Blackfriars to a previously unplanned City terminus at Mansion House.

On Saturday 1 July 1871, an opening banquet was attended by prime minister William Gladstone, who was also a shareholder. The following Monday, Mansion House opened and the District began running its own trains. From this date, the two companies operated a joint inner circle service between Mansion House and Moorgate Street via South Kensington and Edgware Road that ran every ten minutes. (Note: Sources differ about the running of the first inner circle services. Jackson 1986, p. 56 says the operation was shared equally, whereas Lee 1956, pp. 28–29 states the Met ran all the services.) This was supplemented by a District service every ten minutes between Mansion House and West Brompton, and Hammersmith & City Railway and Great Western Railway (GWR) suburban services between Edgware Road and Moorgate Street. The permissions for the railway east of Mansion House were allowed to lapse. At the other end of the line, the District part of South Kensington station opened on 10 July 1871 (Note: The station was completed on 19 July 1871, the Metropolitan and District running a joint connecting bus service from the station to the 1871 International Exhibition.) and Earl's Court station opened on the West Brompton extension on 30 October 1871.

==== West to Putney Bridge, Richmond, Ealing and Hounslow ====
The District Railway's main expansion was to the west. A small station at Earl's Court, between Gloucester Road and West Brompton, opened on 31 October 1871 with three platforms. Lillie Bridge depot, opened in 1872, was built parallel to the West London Joint Railway and initially accessed by a curve onto the West London Line. This curve allowed, from 1 February 1872, the London & North Western Railway (L&NWR) to run a half-hourly outer circle service from Broad Street to Mansion House via Willesden Junction, Addison Road and Earls Court. From 1 October 1872, the GWR also ran a half-hourly middle circle service from the Met's Moorgate Street station to Mansion House via Paddington and Earl's Court.

District Railway (Hammersmith Extension Amalgamation) Act 1874
- Act of Parliament
- Parliament of the United Kingdom
- Long title: An Act for the Amalgamation of the Undertaking of the Hammersmith Extension Railway Company with that of the Metropolitan District Railway Company.
- Citation: 37 & 38 Vict. c. xxxii

Dates
- Royal assent: 30 June 1874

Text of statute as originally enacted

Permission to build a railway 1 1/2 miles (2.4 km) long to Hammersmith was granted in the Hammersmith Extension Railway Act 1873 (36 & 37 Vict. c. cxxxi) on 7 July 1873, the independent Hammersmith Extension Railway having been formed to raise the necessary capital. The new line started from a junction on the curve to Addison Road and also allowed easier access to Lillie Bridge Depot. It opened on 9 September 1874 with one intermediate station at North End (Fulham) (renamed West Kensington in 1877) and a terminus at Hammersmith, and was served by through trains to Mansion House. West Brompton was now served by a shuttle to Earl's Court. The Hammersmith Extension Railway was absorbed by the District Railway via the District Railway (Hammersmith Extension Amalgamation) Act 1874 (37 & 38 Vict. c. xxxii). Earl's Court station burnt down in 1875 and a larger replacement with four tracks and two island platforms opened on 1 February 1878. This was sited to the west of the original station; to the east of the station a flying junction was built to separate traffic to Kensington (High Street) and from Gloucester Road.

In December 1876, six trains per hour ran on the inner circle between Mansion House and Aldgate. The District operated four trains per hour from Mansion House to Hammersmith. Also leaving every hour from Mansion House were two GWR middle circle services to Aldgate via Addison Road and two L&NWR services to Broad Street via Willesden Junction. Three services an hour travelled between West Brompton and Earl's Court.

The District Railway in the Hammersmith area in 1877 showing the route to Richmond over the lines of the London and South Western Railway (L&SWR)

In 1864 the London and South Western Railway (L&SWR) had obtained permission for the Kensington and Richmond line. The route headed north from Addison Road on the West London Railway before curving round to serve Hammersmith at a station at Hammersmith (Grove Road) (linked to the Hammersmith & City Railway station by footbridge), Turnham Green, Brentford Road (Gunnersbury from 1871) and Kew Gardens and Richmond. The line opened on 1 January 1869, the L&SWR running services from Waterloo and Ludgate Hill via Addison Road, and the L&NWR running services from Broad Street to Richmond from a link at Brentford Road to the North London Line at South Acton. Stations opened on the line at Shaftesbury Road (Ravenscourt Park from 1888) and Shepherds Bush on 1 May 1874.

In 1875 permission was given for a 1/2-mile (0.80 km) link from the District station at Hammersmith to a junction just east of Ravenscourt Park. As the L&SWR line was on a viaduct and the District line in a cutting, the line rose steeply. On 1 June 1877, the Hammersmith branch was extended to Richmond, initially with a service of one train an hour to Mansion House. The Met and GWR Hammersmith & City line had access by a link just north of their Hammersmith station and diverted a service to Richmond from 1 October 1877.

From 1 May 1878 to 30 September 1880, the Midland Railway operated a circular service from St Pancras to Earl's Court via Dudding Hill, Acton and the L&SWR to Hammersmith. In 1879 the District opened a junction west of L&SWR's Turnham Green station for a 3 miles (4.8 km) line to Ealing. With stations at Acton Green (now Chiswick Park), Mill Hill Park (now Acton Town), Ealing Common and Ealing Broadway, the Ealing station was built just north of the GWR station. On 4 July 1878, permission was granted to extend the West Brompton branch as far as the Thames. Stations opened at Walham Green (now Fulham Broadway), Parsons Green. The line terminated at Putney Bridge & Fulham (now Putney Bridge). The line opened on 1 March 1880, in time for the University Boat Race held that year on 22 March. Initially the service was two trains an hour to Mansion House, supplemented from 1 April by two trains an hour to High Street Kensington. (Note: The service connected with steamboats on the Thames and substantial traffic was gained after the Wandsworth and Putney Bridges were freed from tolls in June 1880.)

The District Railway in Hounslow in the late 19th century. In 1886 Hounslow Town was replaced by Heston Hounslow.

Hounslow and Metropolitan Railway Act 1866
- Act of Parliament
- Parliament of the United Kingdom
- Long title: An Act for making a Railway from the Acton and Brentford Railway to Hounslow; and for other Purposes.
- Citation: 29 & 30 Vict. c. cccxxxvi

Dates
- Royal assent: 6 August 1866

Hounslow and Metropolitan Railway Act 1880
- Act of Parliament
- Parliament of the United Kingdom
- Long title: An Act for incorporating a Company and authorising them to make and maintain a Railway from Hounslow to Ealing, in the county of Middlesex; and for other purposes.
- Citation: 43 & 44 Vict. c. cxc

Dates
- Royal assent: 26 August 1880

Text of statute as originally enacted

Hounslow and Metropolitan Railway Act 1883
- Act of Parliament
- Parliament of the United Kingdom
- Long title: An Act for conferring further powers on the Hounslow and Metropolitan Railway Company; and for other purposes.
- Citation: 46 & 47 Vict. c. xlix

Dates
- Royal assent: 29 June 1883

The Hounslow and Metropolitan Railway Act 1866 (29 & 30 Vict. c. cccxxxvi) granted permission to landowners in the Hounslow area for a Hounslow and Metropolitan Railway to connect to a proposed Acton and Brentford Railway. However, this had never been built, but with the District now at Acton there was an alternative. Permission was granted in 1880 for a nearly 5 1/2-mile-long (8.9 km) railway from Mill Hill Park station to Hounslow Barracks, with stations at South Ealing, Boston Road and Spring Grove, and agreement reached for the District to work the line. On 1 May 1883 the District started a service to Hounslow Town, calling at South Ealing, Boston Road (now Boston Manor) and Osterley & Spring Grove (replaced by Osterley). A single-track line from junction near Hounslow Town to Hounslow Barracks (now Hounslow West) opened a year later in 1884. Traffic was light and Hounslow Barracks was initially served by a shuttle to Osterley & Spring Grove that connected to an off-peak Hounslow Town to Mill Hill Park train. Hounslow Town station closed in 1886 and Heston Hounslow station (now Hounslow Central) opened.

From 1 March 1883 to 30 September 1885, via a connection to the GWR tracks at Ealing, the District ran a service to Windsor.

=== Expansion, 1874–1900 ===
==== Completing the circle ====
Metropolitan District Railway Act 1887
- Act of Parliament
- Parliament of the United Kingdom
- Long title: An Act to confer further powers on the Metropolitan District Railway Company and for other purposes.
- Citation: 50 & 51 Vict. c. clvi

Dates
- Royal assent: 8 August 1887

Text of statute as originally enacted

The joint line (shown in blue) that completed the inner circle in 1884 and gave the Metropolitan and District Railways access to the East London Railway. The Met's station at the Tower of London was closed soon after the line was opened. District services were extended east of Whitechapel over the Whitechapel and Bow Railway in 1902.

Conflict between the Met and the District and the expense of construction delayed the completion of the inner circle. In 1874, frustrated City financiers formed the Metropolitan Inner Circle Completion Railway Company with the aim of finishing the route. The company was supported by the District railway and obtained parliamentary authority on 7 August 1874, but struggled with funding. The time allowed was extended in 1876. A meeting between the District and Metropolitan was held in 1877, the Met now wishing to access the South Eastern Railway (SER) via the East London Railway (ELR). Both companies promoted and obtained an act of Parliament, the Metropolitan and District Railways (City Lines and Extensions) Act 1879 (42 & 43 Vict. c. cci), for the extension and a link to the ELR. The act also ensured future co-operation by allowing both companies access to the whole circle. (Note: The Metropolitan and District Railways (City Lines and Extensions) Act 1879 (42 & 43 Vict. c. cci) received royal assent on 11 August 1879.) A large contribution was made by authorities for road and sewer improvements. In 1882 the Met extended its line from Aldgate to a temporary station at Tower of London. Two contracts to build joint lines were placed, one from Mansion House to the Tower in 1882 and a second from the circle north of Aldgate to Whitechapel with a curve onto the ELR in 1883. From 1 October 1884 the District and Metropolitan began local services from St Mary's via this curve onto the East London Railway to SER's New Cross station. (Note: The East London Railway now forms part of the London Overground. Stations between St Mary's and New Cross served by the District were Shadwell and Wapping before passing under the Thames through the 1843 Thames tunnel and calling at Rotherhithe and Deptford Road (now Surrey Quays).) After an official opening ceremony on 17 September and trial running, a circular service started on Monday 6 October 1884. On the same day the District extended its services to Whitechapel and over the ELR to New Cross, calling at new joint stations at Aldgate East and St Mary's. Joint stations opened on the circle line at Cannon Street, Eastcheap (Monument from 1 November 1884) and Mark Lane. The Met's Tower of London station closed on 12 October 1884 after the District refused to sell tickets to the station. After opening the District service from New Cross four trains an hour ran alternately to Hammersmith or Putney, but as passenger demand was low after a month this was reduced to two trains an hour to Ealing. Four trains an hour went from Whitechapel, two to Putney, one to Hammersmith and one to Richmond. The middle and outer circle services continued operating from Mansion House at two per hour each. Initially the inner circle service was eight trains an hour, completing the 13 miles (21 kilometres) circuit in 81–84 minutes, but this proved impossible to maintain and service was reduced to six trains an hour with a 70-minute timing in 1885. Initially guards were permitted no relief breaks during their shift until September 1885 when they were permitted three 20-minute breaks.

==== South to Wimbledon ====
Several schemes to cross the Thames at Putney Bridge to Guildford, Surbiton or Wimbledon had been proposed and received approval from Parliament, although the District had been unable to raise the necessary funding. In 1886 the L&SWR replaced these plans with the Wimbledon and Fulham Railway that started on the west side of Wimbledon and crossing Thames to meet the District's Putney Bridge station. The line had intermediate stations at Wimbledon Park, Southfields and East Putney and a junction connected the line to the L&SWR's Waterloo to Reading Line just north of East Putney station. The District had running rights and extended some Putney services to Wimbledon on 3 June 1889.

=== East to East Ham ===
In 1897 the nominally independent Whitechapel and Bow Railway received permission for a link from the District Railway at Whitechapel to the London, Tilbury and Southend Railway (LT&SR) at an above-ground junction at Bow, to the west of Bromley station. The LT&SR and District jointly took over the company the following year and the line opened on 2 June 1902 with new stations at Stepney Green, Mile End and Bow Road. Some District services were extended from Whitechapel to East Ham and one train each morning and evening ran through to Upminster. (Note: The stations served on the LT&SR were Bromley (now Bromley-by-Bow), West Ham, Plaistow, Upton Park, East Ham, Barking, Dagenham (now Dagenham East), Hornchurch and Upminster.) In July 1902 four trains an hour ran from Bow Road (2 to 3 from East Ham) to Ealing or Wimbledon and two trains an hour from New Cross served Hammersmith or Richmond. The outer circle continued to run from Mansion House, the GWR's middle circle having started at Earl's Court from 1900.

=== Uxbridge ===
Ealing and South Harrow Railway Act 1894
- Act of Parliament
- Parliament of the United Kingdom
- Long title: An Act for making a Railway between Ealing and South Harrow in the county of Middlesex and for other purposes.
- Citation: 57 & 58 Vict. c. ccxv

Dates
- Royal assent: 25 August 1894

Text of statute as originally enacted

The District sought to serve Harrow and Uxbridge and in 1892 a route from Ealing to Roxeth (South Harrow) was surveyed and a bill presented in the name of the nominally independent Ealing and South Harrow Railway (E&SHR), becoming law as the Ealing and South Harrow Railway Act 1894 (57 & 58 Vict. c. ccxv). Construction started in 1897 and by the end of 1899 it was largely complete, but with low traffic prospects remained unopened. To reach Uxbridge a line from South Harrow via Ruislip was authorised in 1897. The District had problems raising the finance and the Metropolitan offered a rescue package whereby they would build a branch from Harrow to Rayners Lane and take over the line to Uxbridge, with the District retaining running rights for up to three trains an hour. The Metropolitan built the railway to Uxbridge and began running services on 4 July 1904.

=== Electrification, 1900–1906 ===
==== Development ====
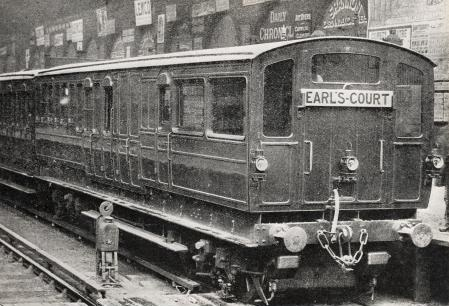
The jointly owned experimental passenger train that ran for six months in 1900

At the start of the 20th century the District and Metropolitan railways faced increased competition in central London from new, electric, deep-level tube lines. The City and South London Railway had been a great success when it opened in 1890. After the opening of the Central London Railway in 1900 from Shepherd's Bush to the City with a flat rate fare of 2d, the District and Metropolitan together lost four million passengers between the second half of 1899 and the second half of 1900. The use of steam propulsion led to smoke-filled stations and carriages that were unpopular with passengers (Note: An 1897 Board of Trade report noted that between Edgware Road and King's Cross there were 528 passenger and 14 freight trains every week day and during the peak hour there were 19 trains each way between Baker Street and King's Cross, 15 long cwt (760 kg) of coal was burnt and 1,650 imp gal (7,500 L) water was used, half of which was condensed, the rest evaporating.) and electrification was seen as the way forward. However, electric traction was still in its infancy and agreement would be needed with the Metropolitan because of the shared ownership of the inner circle. A jointly owned train of six coaches successfully ran an experimental passenger service on the Earl's Court to High Street Kensington section for six months in 1900. Tenders were then requested and in 1901 a Metropolitan and District joint committee recommended the Ganz three-phase AC system with overhead wires. Initially this was accepted by both parties.

The District found an investor to finance the upgrade in 1901, American Charles Yerkes. On 15 July 1901, Yerkes established the Metropolitan District Electric Traction Company with himself as managing director and raised £1 million to carry out the electrification, including construction of the generating station and supplying the new rolling stock. Yerkes soon had control of the District Railway and his experiences in the United States led him to favour DC with a track level conductor rail similar to that in use on the City & South London Railway and Central London Railway. After arbitration by the Board of Trade, the DC system was adopted.

The District had permission for a deep-level tube beneath the sub-surface line between Earl's Court and Mansion House and in 1898 bought the Brompton and Piccadilly Circus Railway with authority for a tube from South Kensington to Piccadilly Circus. These plans were combined with those of the Great Northern and Strand Railway, a tube railway with permission to build a line from Strand to Wood Green, to create the Great Northern, Piccadilly and Brompton Railway (GNP&BR). (Note: Yerkes also owned the Baker Street and Waterloo Railway, a deep-level tube railway under construction from Paddington to Elephant & Castle, and the Charing Cross, Euston and Hampstead Railway, a planned tube from Charing Cross to Hampstead and Highgate.) The section of the District's deep-level tube from South Kensington to Mansion house was dropped from plans. In April 1902, the Underground Electric Railways Company of London (UERL) was established, with Yerkes as chairman, to control these companies and manage the planned works. On 8 June 1902, the UERL took over the Traction Company and paid off the company's shareholders with cash and UERL shares. (Note: Like many of Yerkes' schemes in the United States, the structure of the UERL's finances was highly complex and involved the use of novel financial instruments linked to future earnings. Over-optimistic expectations of passenger usage meant that many investors failed to receive the returns expected.)

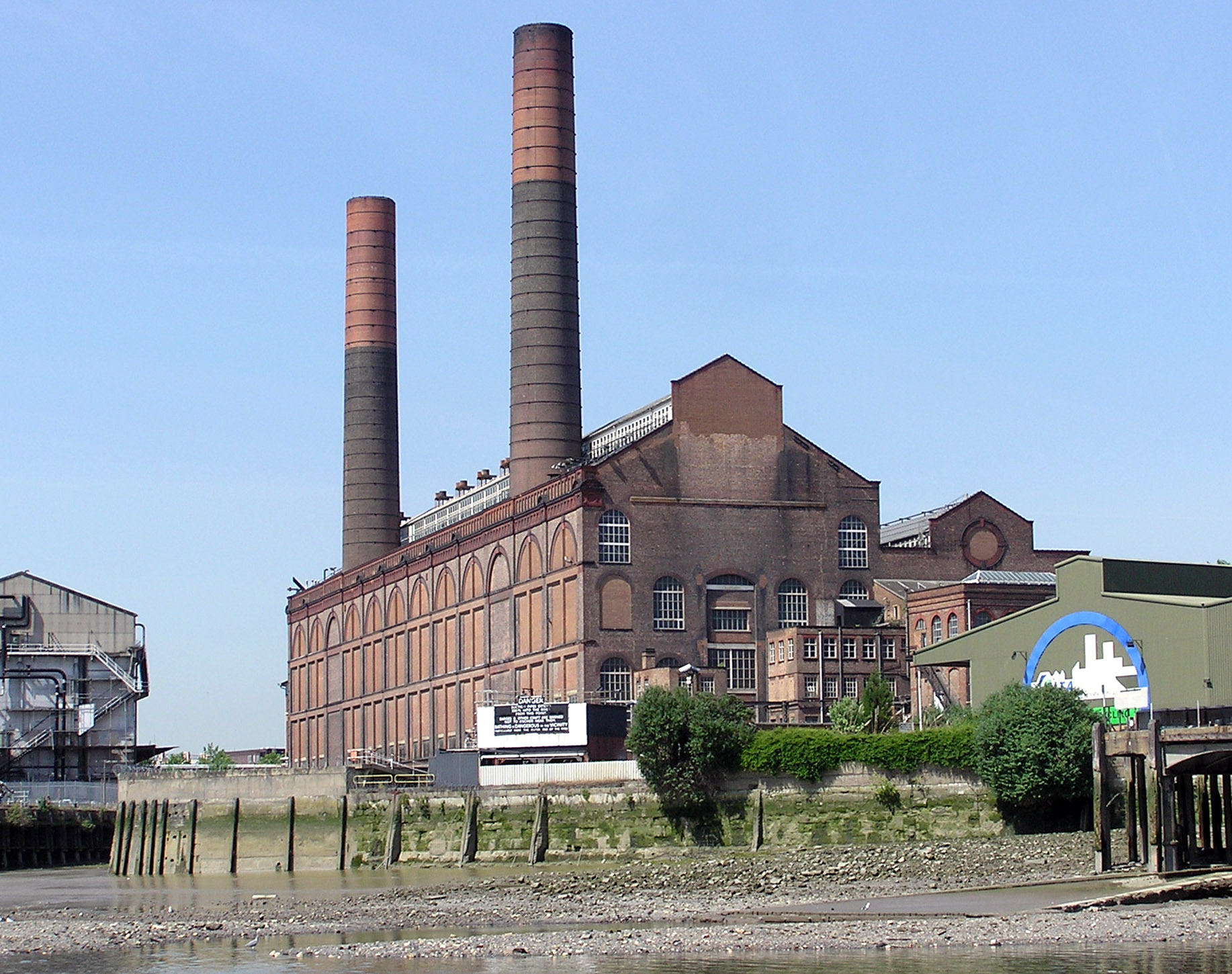
Originally built with four chimneys, Lots Road Power Station provided electricity for all of the UERL's lines

The UERL built a large power station that would be capable of providing power for the District lines and the underground lines planned. Work began in 1902 at Lots Road, by Chelsea Creek and in February 1905 Lots Road Power Station began generating electricity at 11 kV 33 1/3 Hz, conveyed by high voltage cables to substations that converted this to approximately 550V DC.

While the power station was being built, the District electrified the Ealing to Harrow line that was not yet open. It was equipped with automatic signalling using track circuits and pneumatic semaphore signals, and trials were run with two seven car trains. In August 1903, an order was placed for 420 cars and a new maintenance depot was built west of Mill Hill Park (now Acton Town).

After the trials, the line to South Harrow opened in June 1903, from 23 June with a shuttle to Park Royal & Twyford Abbey (now Park Royal) for that year's Royal Agricultural Show. The rest of the line to South Harrow opened the following week on 28 June, with stations at North Ealing, Park Royal & Twyford Abbey, Perivale-Alperton (now Alperton), Sudbury Town, Sudbury Hill and South Harrow.

==== Electric services ====
Electric services began on 13 June 1905 between Hounslow and South Acton, using the line from Mill Hill Park to South Acton for a passenger service for the first time. Hounslow Town station was reopened, trains reversing at the station before continuing to Hounslow Barracks using a new single track curve. On 1 July 1905 electric trains began running from Ealing to Whitechapel, and on the same day the Metropolitan and District railways both introduced electric units on the inner circle. However, a Metropolitan multiple unit overturned the positive current rail on the District Railway, and investigation showed an incompatibility between the way the shoe-gear was mounted on the Met trains and the District Railway track, and the Met trains were withdrawn from the District lines. After modification the Met returned and electric trains took over on 24 September, reducing the travel time around the circle from seventy to fifty minutes. By September, after withdrawing services over the unelectrified East London Line and the LT&SR east of East Ham, the District were running electric services on all remaining routes. From December 1905 the L&NWR service was hauled by electric locomotives from Mansion House to Earl's Court, where a L&NWR steam locomotive took over.

In 1907 the weekday off-peak service was four trains per hour from East Ham to Ealing Broadway, four per hour from Mansion House to alternately Richmond and Wimbledon and two per hour from Wimbledon to High Street Kensington and Ealing Broadway to Whitechapel. Four trains per hour ran from Putney Bridge to Earl's Court, two continuing to High Street Kensington. From South Harrow there were two trains per hour to Mill Hill Park, and four trains per hour from Hounslow Barracks to Mill Hill Park, two of these continuing to South Acton.

Meanwhile, the UERL's GNP&BR tube railway was under construction, surfacing west of West Kensington and entering two terminal platforms on the north side of the District's Hammersmith station. A new station, Barons Court, was built with two island platforms, one for each railway. As there was space at Lillie Bridge Depot after the District had moved to Mill Hill Park, the GNP&BR took over part of the site for its depot. Barons Court opened 9 October 1905 and the tube railway opened as the Piccadilly line on 15 December 1906.

=== London Underground, 1908–1933 ===
==== Running an electric railway ====
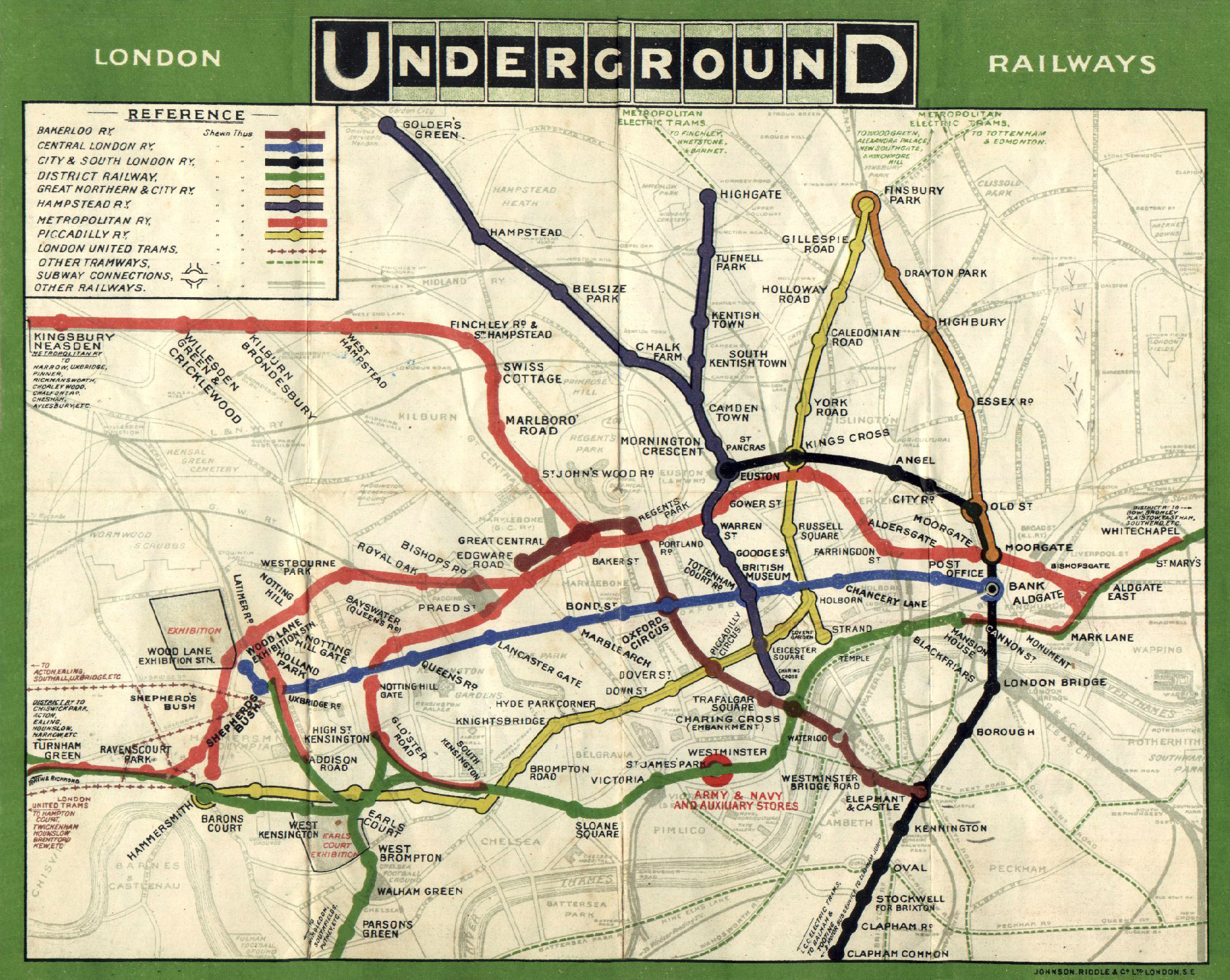
The joint UNDERGROUND map published in 1908. The District Railway is shown in green.

In 1908 the UERL and the other underground railway companies in London came to a joint marketing arrangement that included maps, joint publicity and combined ticketing. UNDERGROUND signs were used outside stations in Central London. The UERL eventually controlled all underground railways in London except the Waterloo & City Railway, the Metropolitan Railway and its subsidiary the Great Northern & City Railway, and introduced station name boards with a red disc and a blue bar.

'Non-stop' working was introduced on the District in December 1907. Usually just a few stations were missed; trains were marked NON STOP or ALL STATIONS as appropriate and panels beside the doors listed the stations the train would skip. East of Bow Road station the District shared the tracks with LT&SR steam engines and widening the railway to East Ham was considered essential. Four tracks were laid and two electrified as far as Barking, where the Tilbury and Upminster routes separated. On 1 April 1908 District trains were extended through to Barking and the work was largely finished in July 1908. After 2 May 1909 trains no longer reversed at Hounslow Town after the station was closed and a new Hounslow Town station opened on the direct route.

Since 1904, after the District had notified the Met that it would not use its running rights on the Uxbridge line with steam trains, it had not run services, although it paid the £2,000 a year that was due under the enabling act. When the District suggested running as far as Rayners Lane, the Met responded with a proposal to rebuild the station as a District terminus. The District proposed running trains through to Uxbridge, leading to negotiations about the charges for traction current before District services were extended to Uxbridge on 1 March 1910. In 1910 a platform was built at Mill Hill Park for the Hounslow and Uxbridge shuttles and a flying junction built north of the station to separate the Ealing and Hounslow traffic. The station was renamed Acton Town on 1 March 1910.

Between Turnham Green and Ravenscourt Park the District shared tracks with L&SWR steam trains to Richmond, a GWR steam service from Richmond to Ladbroke Grove and Midland coal trains. (Note: In March 1878 the Midland Railway had opened a Goods and Coal Depot near West Kensington and coal depot near Kensington High Street.) The District and L&SWR agreed to quadruple the tracks to allow a pair for the District's sole use and build a station on the District tracks at Stamford Brook. The line was first used on 3 December 1911 and Stamford Brook opened on 1 February 1912. However, the GWR had already withdrawn their service and L&SWR was to withdraw in 1916. A flying junction separating the Richmond and Hammersmith routes west of Earl's Court opened in January 1914.

From 1910 to 1939 the LT&SR ran through trains between Ealing Broadway and Southend or Shoeburyness, hauled west of Barking by the District's electric locomotives that were no longer needed for the L&NWR's outer circle service, and east of Barking by steam locomotive. From 1912 two specially built sets of saloon coaches with retention toilets were used. In the 1920s the off-peak weekday service was a train every ten minutes from Wimbledon and Ealing and every fifteen minutes from Richmond. Six trains per hour ran from Putney Bridge to High Street Kensington. Trains from Hounslow left every 6–8 minutes, terminating at Acton Town or South Acton. Six trains per hour left Hammersmith for South Harrow, three continuing to Uxbridge. In 1925 the inner circle service was ten trains per hour in each direction, but this frequency of service caused problems. A reduction to eight would leave the Kensington High Street to Edgware Road section with too few trains. However the Metropolitan had recently rebuilt it with four platforms as part of an abandoned plan for a tube to Kilburn. The District extended its Putney to High Street service to Edgware Road and the Metropolitan provided all inner circle trains at a frequency of eight trains per hour. (Note: The District continued to provide four trains on Sundays to keep crews familiar with the route.)

In 1923 the London, Midland and Scottish Railway had inherited the LT&SR line to Barking, and in 1929 proposed quadrupling the line to Upminster and electrifying one pair of tracks for use by the District. On 12 September 1932 services started with new stations at Upney and Heathway (now Dagenham Heathway) with platforms only on the District tracks.

==== Piccadilly line extension ====
In November 1912 a bill was published that included a plan to extend the Piccadilly tube tracks westwards from Hammersmith to connect to the L&SWR's Richmond branch tracks. The bill passed as the London Electric Railway Act 1913 (3 & 4 Geo. 5. c. xcvii) on 15 August 1913, although the advent of World War I prevented work on the extension.

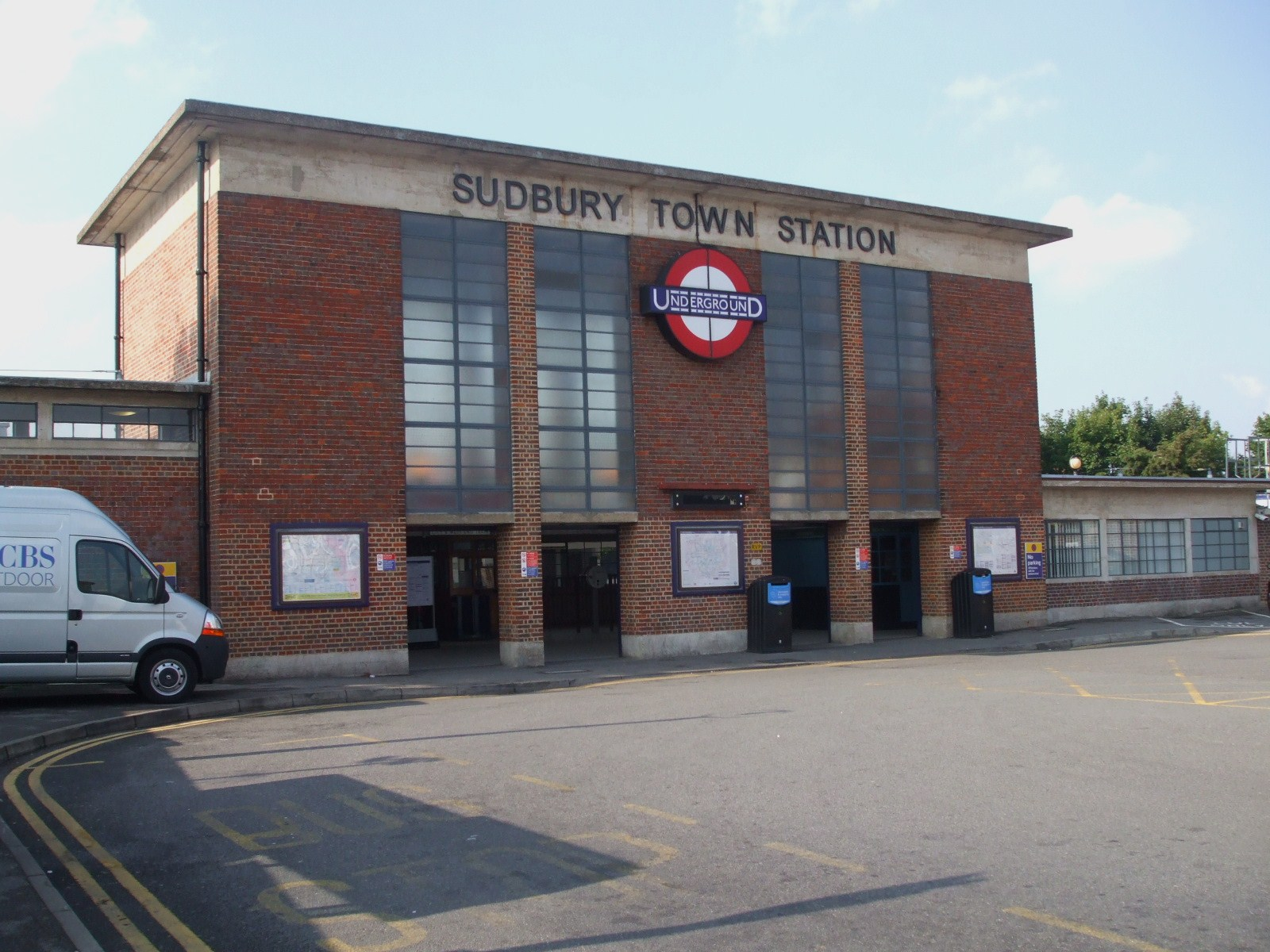
When Sudbury Town was rebuilt in July 1931 it was the prototype developing Holden's architectural style.

Powers were renewed in 1926 for the quadruple track from Hammersmith to be extended to west of Acton Town, with the concept of the Piccadilly running non-stop on the inner pair. The proposed service split, with the Piccadilly running through to Harrow and Hounslow, was clarified by 1929. District services would run mainly through to Wimbledon, Richmond, Hounslow and Ealing, with shuttles from South Harrow to Uxbridge and Acton Town to South Acton.

With finance guaranteed by the Development (Loan Guarantees and Grants) Act 1929 (20 & 21 Geo. 5. c. 7), construction started in 1930. Two additional tracks were built from west of Turnham Green to Northfields on the Hounslow branch. East of Turnham Green a freight loop was built for eastbound coal trains from Richmond to Kensington. Acton Town was rebuilt with five platforms, and a depot was built west of Northfields station.

Several stations were rebuilt in a Modernist style influenced or designed by Charles Holden, who was inspired by examples of Modernist architecture in mainland Europe. This influence can be seen in the bold vertical and horizontal forms, which were combined with the use of traditional materials like brick. Holden called them 'brick boxes with concrete lids'. Today, several of these Holden-designed stations are listed buildings, including the prototype Sudbury Town listed as Grade II*.

On 4 July 1932 the District service from Acton Town to South Harrow was withdrawn and one in three Piccadilly trains extended from Hammersmith to South Harrow, the District continuing to run a shuttle from South Harrow to Uxbridge. On 18 December 1932 all four tracks to Northfields opened and from 9 January 1933 Piccadilly trains started to run to Northfields, continuing to Hounslow West from 13 March 1933. District trains continued to run through to Hounslow off-peak, with a shuttle from South Acton.

=== London Passenger Transport Board, 1933 ===
The UERL's ownership of the highly profitable London General Omnibus Company (LGOC) since 1912 had enabled the UERL group, through the pooling of revenues, to use profits from the bus company to subsidise the less profitable railways. (Note: By having a virtual monopoly of bus services, the LGOC was able to make large profits and pay dividends far higher than the underground railways ever had. In 1911, the year before its take over by the UERL, the dividend had been 18 per cent.) However, competition from numerous small bus companies during the early 1920s eroded the profitability of the LGOC and had a negative impact on the profitability of the group.

To protect the UERL group's income, its chairman Lord Ashfield lobbied the government for regulation of transport services in the London area. Starting in 1923, a series of legislative initiatives were made in this direction, with Ashfield and Labour London County Councillor (later MP and Minister of Transport) Herbert Morrison, at the forefront of debates as to the level of regulation and public control under which transport services should be brought. Ashfield aimed for regulation that would give the UERL group protection from competition and allow it to take control of the LCC's tram system; Morrison preferred full public ownership. After seven years of false starts, a bill was announced at the end of 1930 for the formation of the London Passenger Transport Board (LPTB), a public corporation that would take control of the UERL, the Metropolitan Railway and all bus and tram operators within an area designated as the London Passenger Transport Area. The Board was a compromise – public ownership but not full nationalisation – and came into existence on 1 July 1933. On this date, ownership of the assets of the District and the other Underground companies transferred to the LPTB.

=== Legacy ===
The railway became the District line of London Transport. From 23 October 1933 a Piccadilly line service replaced the Harrow to Uxbridge District shuttle. In 1923 the London, Midland and Scottish Railway (LMS) had taken over the L&NWR railway's outer circle service from Earl's Court and by the Second World War this had been cut back to an electrified Earl's Court to Willesden Junction shuttle. Following bombing of the West London Line in 1940 the LMS and the Metropolitan line services to Addison Road were both suspended. After the war, to serve the Kensington exhibition halls a District line shuttle service started from Earl's Court to Addison Road, now renamed Kensington Olympia.

The off-peak District Hounslow branch shuttle to South Acton was discontinued on 29 April 1935 and replaced by an Acton Town to South Acton shuttle. This shuttle was withdrawn on 28 February 1959, and the peak hour District line through service to Hounslow was withdrawn on 9 October 1964. In the 1970s the Hounslow branch became the Heathrow branch when it was extended to serve Heathrow Airport, first on 19 July 1975 to serve Hatton Cross and then on 16 December 1977 when Heathrow Central opened. Later on 27 March 2008, the branch was extended to Heathrow Terminal 5.

== Rolling stock ==
=== Steam locomotives ===
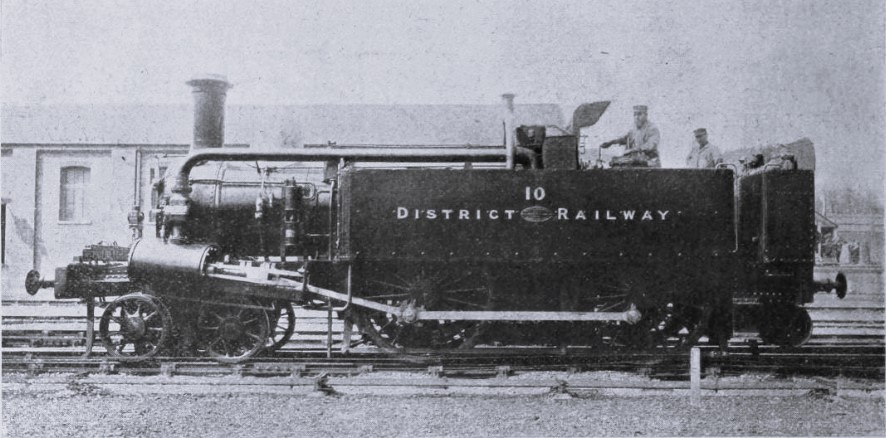
District Railway locomotive No. 10

When in 1871 the District Railway needed its own locomotives, they ordered twenty four condensing steam locomotives from Beyer Peacock similar to the A Class locomotives the Metropolitan Railway was using on the route. As they were intended for an underground railway, the locomotives did not have cabs, but had a weatherboard with a bent-back top. The back plate of the bunker was raised to provide protection when running bunker first. A total of fifty four locomotives were purchased. They were still in service in 1905 when the line was electrified, and all but six were sold the following year.

In 1928, from November 5-11, the 60th anniversary of the railway's opening, the District Railway arranged an exhibition train at South Kensington Station, composed of various types of rolling stock, past and what was present in 1928. First in the train was engine No. 34, built in 1883 by the Bayer, Peacock and Co. Ltd., an outside cylinder 4-4-0 steam locomotive, and what was then the sole remaining steam engine in service.

=== Electric locomotives ===
In 1905 the District bought ten bogie box cab locomotives that looked similar to their multiple units but were only 25 feet (7.6 m) long. They were manufactured by the Metropolitan Amalgamated Carriage and Wagon Company and most had a single cab at one end. Consequently, they were operated in pairs, coupled back to back with the cabs at the outer end.

The locomotives were used to haul L&NWR passenger trains on the electrified section of the Outer Circle route between Earl's Court and Mansion House. After December 1908 these services terminated at Earl's Court. The locomotives were used to haul District trains, one coupled to each end of a rake of four trailer cars. From 1910 the locomotives were used on London, Tilbury and Southend Railway (LT&SR) trains extended over the District line, west of Barking. (Steam locomotives were used east of Barking.)

=== Carriages ===
The steam carriages were four wheeled, 29 feet 2 inches (8.89 m) long over the buffers. First, second and third class compartments were available. First class carriages had four compartments, the others five. Lighting was initially provided by burning coal gas held in bags on the roof, later by a pressurised oil gas system. At first they were fitted with a chain brake. This was replaced by the simple Westinghouse brake and then a fully automatic Westinghouse brake.

Initially trains were made up of eight carriages, but after 1879 nine became the standard. At the end of 1905 the District replaced 395 carriages with electric multiple units. A preserved carriage at the Kent and East Sussex Railway was thought to be a District Railway first class, but now thought likely to be a cutdown Metropolitan Railway eight wheeler.

=== Electric multiple units ===
In 1903 the District tested two seven-car trains with different control and brake systems on its unopened line between Ealing and South Harrow. Access to the car was by platforms with lattice gates at their ends and hand-operated sliding doors on the car sides. Later some trailer cars were fitted with driving controls and two and three car trains operated from Mill Hill Park to Hounslow and South Harrow and later Uxbridge until they were withdrawn in 1925.

The District Railway ordered 60 x 7-car electric trains in 1903. A third of the vehicles were made in England, the rest in Belgium and France and electrical equipment was installed on arrival at Ealing Common Works. Access was by sliding doors, double doors in the centre and single doors at either end. First and third class accommodation were provided in open saloons with electric lighting. The seats were covered with rattan in third class and plush in first. From 1906 the standard formation was six cars, with an equal number of motor and trailer cars running in either two or four car formations off-peak. By 1910 the District required additional rolling stock and ordered cars largely constructed of steel. The first batch arrived in 1911, followed by more in 1912 from a different manufacturer but to a similar design. Further cars arrived in 1914 with an elliptical roof instead of the clerestory roof (Note: A clerestory roof has a raised centre section with small windows and/or ventilators.) on the earlier designs. In 1920 the District took delivery of new cars, incompatible with the existing fleet, with three hand-operated double sliding doors on each side.

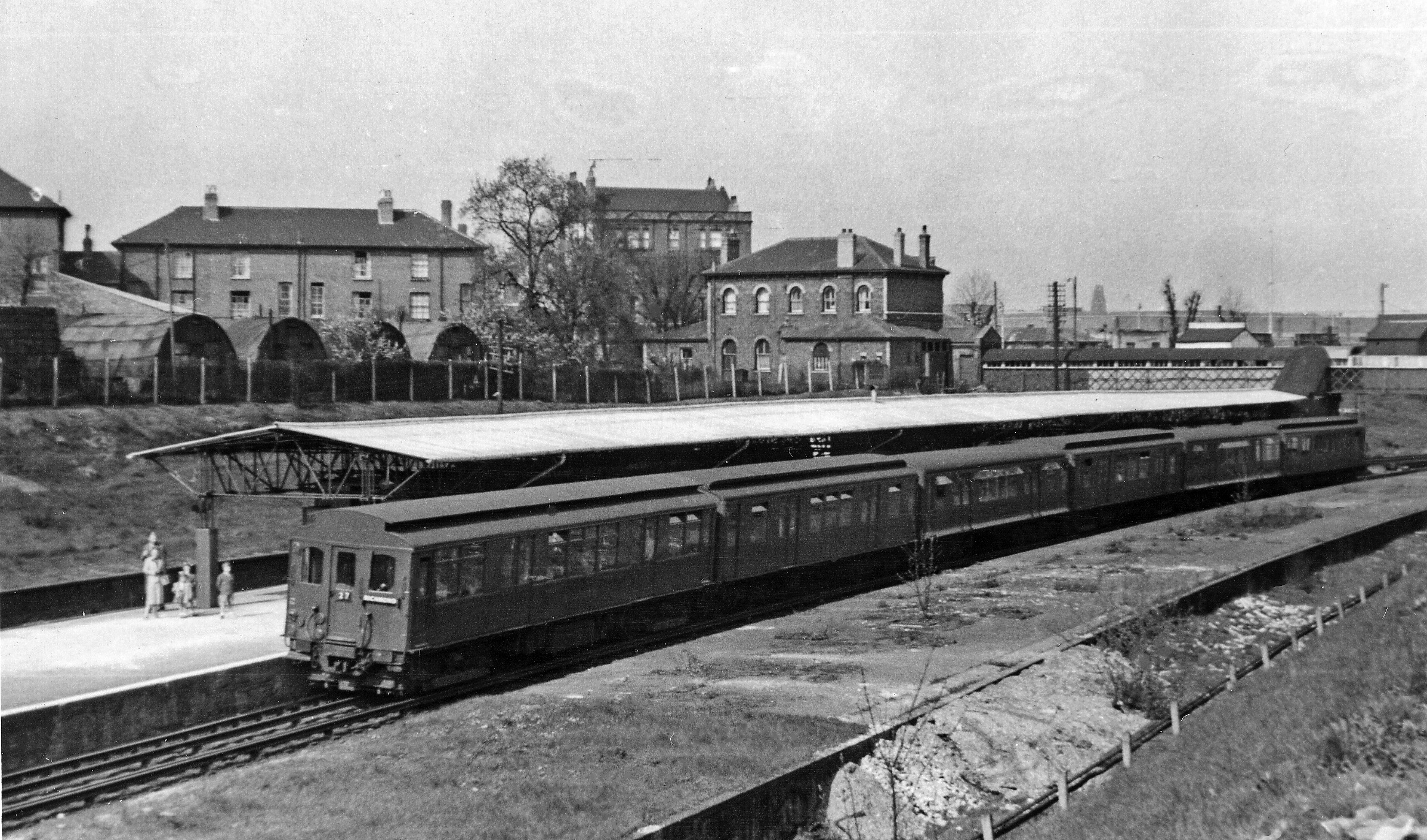
A District line train at Gunnersbury in 1955. The leading car, with a clerestory roof, is one of the District Railway cars built in 1923.

In 1923 fifty motor car bodies were ordered to allow some of the original 1904–05 car bodies to be scrapped. From 1926 two stock pools were created. Main line trains were formed from 101 new motor cars supplemented by motor cars rebuilt from the steel bodied cars originally constructed in 1910–14 and 1923, and trailers modified from the original wooden bodied cars. A small pool of unmodified 'local stock' worked the shuttles from Acton Town to South Acton, South Harrow and Hounslow.

In 1932 the line to Upminster was electrified and new vehicles were purchased. After the District Railway became part of London Underground, similar cars were ordered to allow the Metropolitan line be extended to Barking and replace some of the rapidly deteriorating original wooden trailers. The 1935–40 New Works Programme fitted electro-pneumatic brakes and air-operated doors to most of the District line stock and allowed the remaining wooden cars to be scrapped. A number of motor cars were not suitable for conversion and so some trains retained their hand-worked doors and these ran until 1957.

As of March 2015 a driving motor car built in 1923 is a static exhibit at London Transport Museum at Covent Garden.

== See also ==
- London Underground
- Metropolitan Railway
- District line
- Circle line
- Metropolitan line
- Hammersmith & City line
- Piccadilly line

== Notes and references ==
=== Bibliography ===
- Badsey-Ellis, Antony (2005). London's Lost Tube Schemes. Capital Transport. ISBN 1-85414-293-3. Snippet view at google.com, retrieved 20 August 2012
- Bruce, J Graeme (1983). Steam to Silver. A history of London Transport Surface Rolling Stock. Capital Transport. ISBN 0-904711-45-5.
- Bruce, J Graeme (1987). Workhorses of the London Underground. Harrow Weald: Capital Transport. ISBN 0-904711-87-0.
- Day, John R.; Reed, John (2008) [1963]. The Story of London's Underground (10th ed.). Capital Transport. ISBN 978-1-85414-316-7.
- Green, Oliver (1987). The London Underground — An illustrated history. Ian Allan. ISBN 0-7110-1720-4.
- Goudie, Frank (1990). Metropolitan Steam Locomotives. Capital Transport. ISBN 978-1-85414-118-7.
- Horne, Mike (2003). The Metropolitan Line. Capital Transport. ISBN 1-85414-275-5.
- Horne, Mike (2006). The District Line. Capital Transport. ISBN 1-85414-292-5.
- Jackson, Alan (1986). London's Metropolitan Railway. David & Charles. ISBN 0-7153-8839-8. Snippet view at google.com, retrieved 20 August 2012
- Jackson, Alan (1992). The Railway Dictionary: An A-Z of Railway Terminology. Sutton Publishing. ISBN 07509-00385.
- Lee, Charles E. (1956). The Metropolitan District Railway. The Oakwood Press. ASIN B0000CJGHS.
- Rose, Douglas (December 2007) [1980]. The London Underground: A Diagrammatic History (8th ed.). Harrow Weald: Capital Transport. ISBN 978-1-85414-315-0.
- Simpson, Bill (2003). A History of the Metropolitan Railway. Vol 1. Lamplight Publications. ISBN 1-899246-07-X.
- Wolmar, Christian (2004). The Subterranean Railway: how the London Underground was built and how it changed the city forever. Atlantic. ISBN 1-84354-023-1.

=== Other publications ===
- Baker, B. (1885). "The Metropolitan and Metropolitan District Railways. (Including Plates at Back of Volume)". Minutes of the Proceedings. 81 (1885). Institution of Civil Engineers: 1–33. doi:10.1680/imotp.1885.21367.
- Barry, J. W. (1885). "The City Lines and Extensions. (Inner Circle Completion) of the Metropolitan and District Railways. (Including Plates at Back of Volume)". Minutes of the Proceedings. 81 (1885). Institution of Civil Engineers: 34–51. doi:10.1680/imotp.1885.21368.
