= Mile End tube station =

London Underground station

Mile End
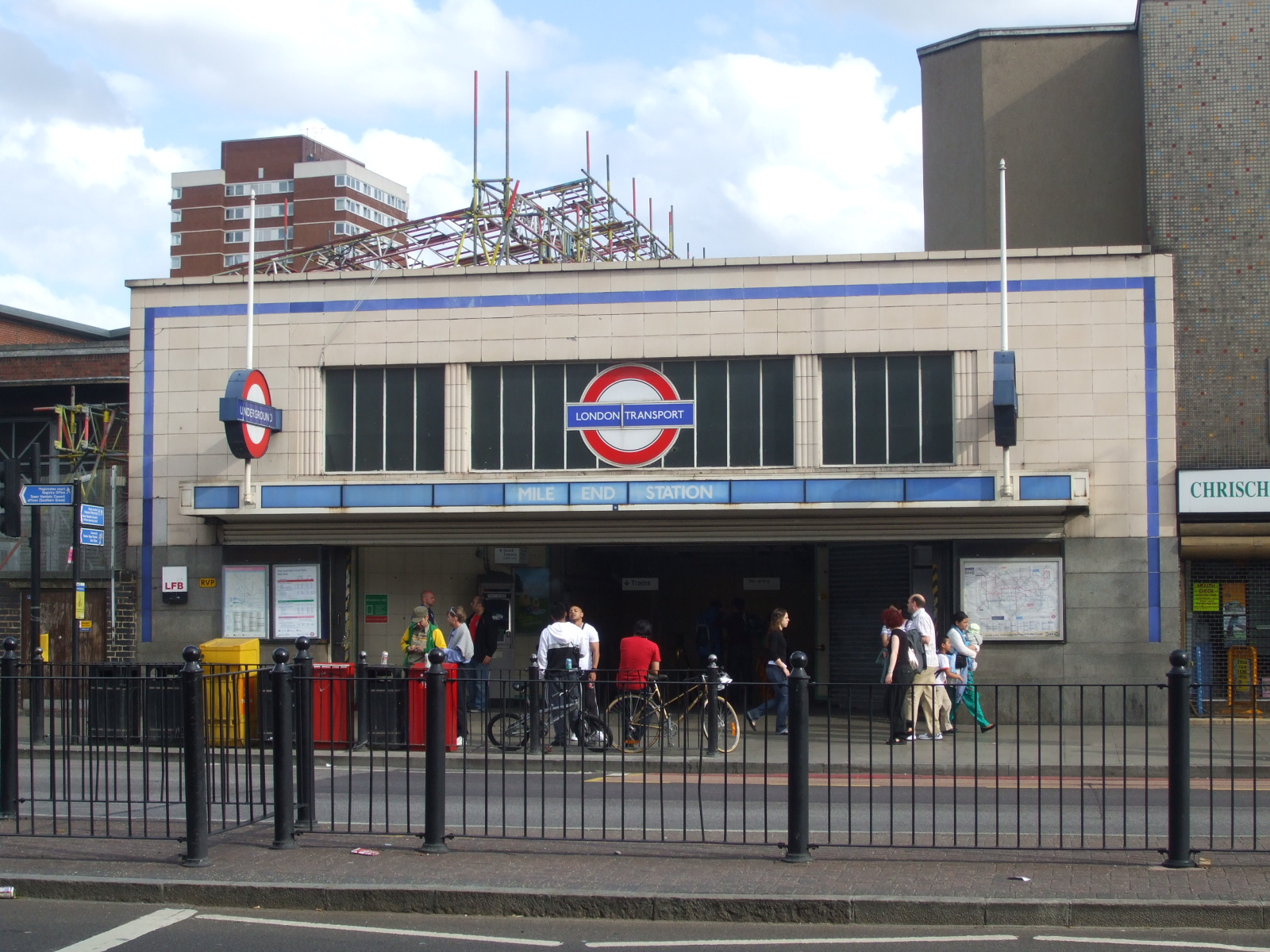
- Station entrance on Mile End Road

General information
- Location: Mile End, Tower Hamlets
- Coordinates: 51.525°N 0.033°W
- Owner: Transport for London
- Manager: London Underground
- Platforms: 4

Other information
- Fare zone: 2
- Website: Official website

History
- Opened: 2 June 1902
- Original company: Whitechapel and Bow Railway

Key dates
- 30 March 1936: Metropolitan line started
- 4 December 1946: Central line started
- 23 January 1950: Ownership transferred to London Transport

Passengers

London Underground annual entry and exit
- 2021: ▼6.64 million
- 2022: ▲11.36 million
- 2023: ▼11.15 million
- 2024: ▼10.80 million
- 2025: ▼10.74 million
Location
- Location in Tower Hamlets

Mile End is a London Underground station located on Mile End Road in the Mile End neighbourhood of the London Borough of Tower Hamlets, East London. It is on the Central line between Bethnal Green to the west and Stratford to the east, and on the District and Hammersmith & City lines between Stepney Green to the west and Bow Road to the east. The station was opened by the Whitechapel and Bow Railway on 2 June 1902 on a new route connecting the District Railway at Whitechapel with the London, Tilbury and Southend Railway to the east of Bow Road. Steam trains were replaced by electric ones on 20 August 1905. Metropolitan line service commenced in 1936. To coincide with the introduction of Central line service in 1946, the station was rebuilt as part of the New Works Programme. It is in London fare zone 2.

== History ==
Mile End station was part of an unsuccessful 1883 proposal to connect the sub-surface Metropolitan Railway with the above ground London, Tilbury and Southend Railway (LTSR). In 1897 the proposal was revived, this time with the District Railway (DR) as the sub-surface partner. Mile End station opened with the Whitechapel and Bow Railway (W&BR) on 2 June 1902. During planning for the station, the name "Burdett Road" was considered and was rejected in 1900 to avoid confusion with Burdett Road railway station. The station structures were designed by the engineer Cuthbert Arthur Brereton. Fourth-rail electric service replaced steam trains on 20 August 1905. The station was owned by the W&BR and was initially run by a joint committee of the two companies. In 1920 the DR took over management on behalf of the owners.

The eastern section of the District line was very overcrowded by the mid 1930s. In order to relieve this, the Metropolitan line service was extended to Barking. (Note: This was achieved by diverting Metropolitan line trains that had previously been routed onto the East London Line at Whitechapel.) Mile End was served by a single daily Metropolitan line train from Hammersmith from 30 March 1936. This was expanded from 4 May 1936 with an eight-trains-per-hour service between Barking and Hammersmith at peak times. This was increased to ten trains per hour at Mile End from 8 May 1938. (Note: The two extra trains terminated at East Ham.) The Hammersmith service was swapped for longer Uxbridge trains from 17 July 1939, at eight trains per hour at peak times. This service was suspended on 6 October 1941 with Hammersmith trains again running to Barking.

Delayed by the Second World War, on 4 December 1946, the Central line was extended from Liverpool Street to Stratford via Mile End with a new station at Bethnal Green. Mile End station was rebuilt as part of the extension. The Transport Act 1947 provided for complete ownership of Mile End station as part of the W&BR to pass to the London Transport Executive and this took place on 23 January 1950. Plans for the Docklands Light Railway announced in 1982 had Mile End as the northern terminus, instead of Stratford, with a section of street running. On 30 July 1990, the Hammersmith–Barking service of the Metropolitan line gained a separate identity as the Hammersmith & City line. From 13 December 2009, off-peak Hammersmith & City line service was extended from Whitechapel to Barking with a daily all-day service at Mile End.

=== Incidents ===
On 5 July 2007, a Central line train was derailed when it hit a roll of fire blanket, which had been blown out of a cross-passage between the two tunnels by the strong crosswinds.

On 17 November 2009, part of a plastic barrier broke off from a departing Central line train and struck three commuters. One woman suffered a 5 cm (2.0 in) cut to her forehead, and London Underground faced a fine of up to £20,000 after admitting liability in the case.

== Design ==
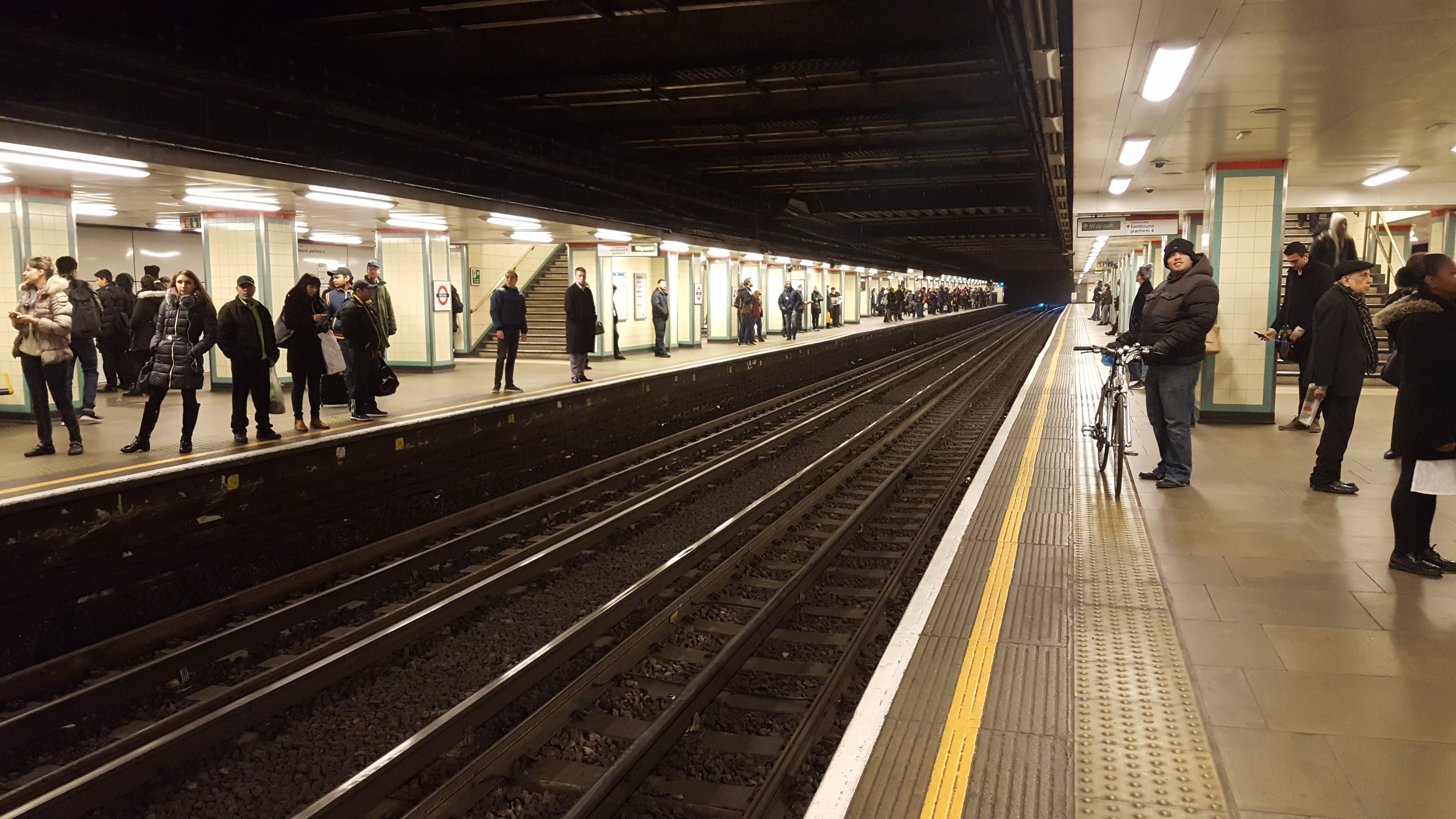
Two sets of island platforms provide cross-platform interchange

No trace remains of the above-ground 1902 Brereton building, but it was identical to Stepney Green station. The station consists of two subterranean island platforms facing four tracks paired by direction to offer cross-platform interchange. Platform 1, the southernmost, is for the westbound Central line, platforms 2 and 3 are for the District and Hammersmith & City lines that share tracks, and platform 4 is for the eastbound Central line. The westbound Central line track uses space that had been used for steam-train vents in the original station design. All of the structures are Stanley Heaps-designed from the rebuilding as part of the New Works Programme extension of the Central line. False ceilings were added above the platforms in the 1980s. The cream and blue tiling in the entrance is original. The platforms were retiled as part of a refurbishment in 2009 and 2010.

== Location ==
The station is located on Mile End Road in the Mile End neighbourhood of the London Borough of Tower Hamlets. Day and nighttime London Buses routes serve the station.

Bow Road is 0.55 km (0.34 miles) to the east of the station and Stepney Green is 1.05 km (0.65 miles) to the west. Stratford is 2.83 km (1.76 miles) to the east of the station and Bethnal Green is 1.64 km (1.02 miles) to the west.

== Services ==
The station is managed by London Underground. It is in London fare zone 2. The typical off-peak service from the station is twelve eastbound District line trains per hour to Upminster with a further three trains to Barking. There are fifteen trains westbound to Earl's Court, of which six continue to Ealing Broadway, six continue to Richmond, and three continue to Wimbledon. At peak periods, the number of trains per hour increases. There are six eastbound Hammersmith & City line trains an hour to Barking and six westbound to Hammersmith at all times.

The Central line off-peak service is twenty-four trains per hour eastbound to Leytonstone, of which nine continue to Epping, three continue to Loughton, three continue to Hainault (via Newbury Park) and three continue to Newbury Park. There are twenty-four trains per hour westbound to White City, of which nine continue to West Ruislip, three continue to Northolt and nine continue to Ealing Broadway. With 10.74 million entries and exits in 2025, it was ranked the 58th busiest London Underground station.

== Notes ==
Preceding station	London Underground	Following station
Bethnal Green towards Ealing Broadway or West Ruislip	Central line	Stratford towards Epping, Hainault or Woodford via Newbury Park
Stepney Green towards Wimbledon, Richmond or Ealing Broadway	District line	Bow Road towards Upminster
Stepney Green towards Hammersmith	Hammersmith & City line	Bow Road towards Barking
