= Bow Road tube station =

London Underground station

Bow Road
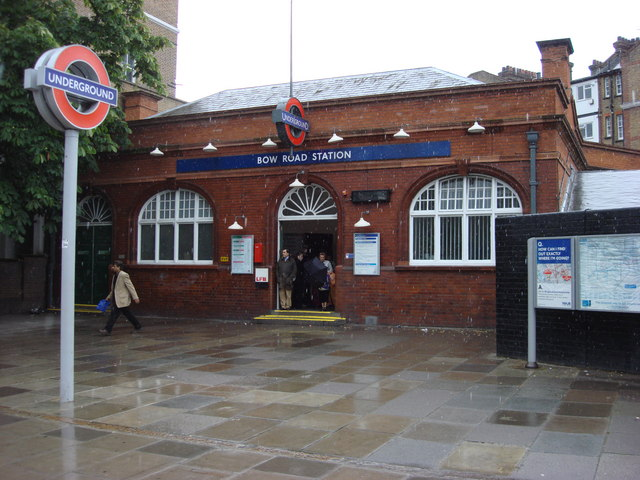
- Entrance to Bow Road

General information
- Location: Bow, Tower Hamlets
- Coordinates: 51.52722°N 0.02472°W
- Owner: Transport for London
- Manager: London Underground
- Platforms: 2
- Connections: Out-of-station interchanges: Bow Church

Other information
- Fare zone: 2
- Website: Official website

History
- Opened: 11 June 1902
- Original company: Whitechapel and Bow Railway

Key dates
- 30 March 1936: Metropolitan line started
- 23 January 1950: Ownership transferred to London Transport

Passengers

London Underground annual entry and exit
- 2021: ▼2.26 million
- 2022: ▲3.83 million
- 2023: ▲4.16 million
- 2024: ▲4.17 million
- 2025: ▼4.04 million

Listed Building – Grade II
- Official name: Bow Road London Transport Underground Station
- Designated: 27 September 1973; 52 years ago
- Reference no.: 1357787
Location
- Location in Tower Hamlets

Bow Road (/ˈboʊ ˈroʊd/) is a London Underground station located on Bow Road in the Bow neighbourhood of the London Borough of Tower Hamlets, East London. It is on the District and Hammersmith & City lines, between Mile End to the west and Bromley-by-Bow to the east. The station was opened by the Whitechapel and Bow Railway on 11 June 1902 on a new route connecting the District Railway at Whitechapel with the London, Tilbury and Southend Railway to the east of the station. Steam trains were replaced by electric on 20 August 1905. Metropolitan line service commenced in 1936. It is in London fare zone 2.

== History ==
Bow Road station was part of an unsuccessful 1883 proposal to connect the sub-surface Metropolitan Railway with the above ground London, Tilbury and Southend Railway (LTSR). In 1897, the proposal was revived, this time with the District Railway (DR) as the sub-surface partner. The Whitechapel and Bow Railway (W&BR) opened on 2 June 1902. During planning for the station, the names "Wellington Road" and then "Bow" were considered. Bow Road station was not ready for the first day of service and opened with temporary buildings on 11 June 1902. The permanent structures were designed by the engineer Cuthbert Arthur Brereton. Fourth-rail electric service replaced steam trains on 20 August 1905. The station was owned by the W&BR and was initially run by a joint committee of the two companies. In 1920, the DR took over management on behalf of the owners.

The eastern section of the District line was very overcrowded by the mid 1930s. In order to relieve this, the Metropolitan line service was extended to Barking. (Note: This was achieved by diverting Metropolitan line trains that had previously been routed onto the East London Line at Whitechapel.) Bow Road was served by a single daily Metropolitan line train from Hammersmith from 30 March 1936. This was expanded from 4 May 1936 with a service of eight trains per hour between Barking and Hammersmith at peak times. This was increased to ten trains per hour at Bow Road from 8 May 1938. (Note: The two extra trains terminated at East Ham.) The Hammersmith service was swapped for longer Uxbridge trains from 17 July 1939, with eight trains per hour at peak times. This service was suspended on 6 October 1941 with Hammersmith trains again running to Barking.

The Transport Act 1947 provided for complete ownership of Bow Road station as part of the W&BR to pass to the London Transport Executive and this took place on 23 January 1950. On 30 July 1990, the Hammersmith–Barking service of the Metropolitan line gained a separate identity as the Hammersmith & City line. From 13 December 2009, off-peak Hammersmith & City line service was extended from Whitechapel to Barking with a daily all-day service at Bow Road.

== Design ==
The station consists of two side platforms—numbered 1 for westbound and 2 for eastbound—either side of the tracks. The platforms are curved and partly underground, with the western section under Bow Road and the eastern section in cutting. The open-air section has canopies held up by wall brackets and the underground part has jack-arched roofing held up by hexagonal columns, of a design also still seen at Stepney Green. The 1902 Brereton-designed buildings are similar to the other new stations at Mile End and Stepney Green, but deviated from their layouts because of the constrained site.

Platforms are 450 feet (140 m) long, built to accommodate longer LTSR trains. The exterior has brown glazed bricks below the windowsills and red brick above. The windows and doors have terracotta surrounds. The interiors have white glazed bricks, except for the footbridge which is finished in brown glazed and red bricks. The original layout had now-disused exit stairways that led to an eastern footbridge and a separate doorway on Bow Road. A room with a bay window onto the westbound platform was a waiting room. East of the station, the tracks rise at 1 in 40 gradient. The station building has been Grade II listed since 27 September 1973.

== Location ==
The station is located on Bow Road in the Bow neighbourhood of the London Borough of Tower Hamlets. The adjacent Wellington Buildings flats, accessed from Wellington Street, were built to house the 286 people displaced to build the railway. Bow Church DLR station is nearby and an out of station interchange is permitted. Day and nighttime London Buses routes serve the station.

Bromley-by-Bow is 1.01 km (0.63 miles) to the east of the station and Mile End is 0.55 km (0.34 miles) to the west. It is 4.22 km (2.62 miles) along the line from Tower Hill in Central London and 20.46 km (12.71 miles) from the eastern terminus at Upminster.

== Services ==
The station is managed by London Underground. It is in London fare zone 2. The typical off-peak service from the station is twelve District line trains per hour to Upminster with a further three trains to Barking. There are fifteen trains westbound to Earl's Court, of which six continue to Ealing Broadway, six continue to Richmond, and three to Wimbledon. At peak periods, the number of trains per hour increases. There are six Hammersmith & City line trains an hour to Barking and six to Hammersmith at all times.

Services towards central London operate from approximately 05:15 to 00:15 and services to Upminster operate from approximately 05:40 to 01:00. The journey time to Upminster is approximately 30 minutes, to Barking 13 minutes, and to Tower Hill in central London 10 minutes. With 4.04 million entries and exits in 2025, it was ranked 147th busiest London Underground station.

== Notes ==
Preceding station	London Underground	Following station
Mile End towards Hammersmith	Hammersmith & City line	Bromley-by-Bow towards Barking
Mile End towards Wimbledon, Richmond or Ealing Broadway	District line	Bromley-by-Bow towards Upminster
