= Stepney Green tube station =

London Underground station

Stepney Green
- Station entrance to Mile End Road

General information
- Location: Stepney, Tower Hamlets
- Coordinates: 51.5219°N 0.0464°W
- Owner: Transport for London
- Manager: London Underground
- Platforms: 2

Other information
- Fare zone: 2
- Website: Official website

History
- Opened: 23 June 1902
- Original company: Whitechapel and Bow Railway

Key dates
- 30 March 1936: Metropolitan line started
- 23 January 1950: Ownership transferred to London Transport

Passengers

London Underground annual entry and exit
- 2021: ▲2.71 million
- 2022: ▲4.69 million
- 2023: ▲5.13 million
- 2024: ▲5.22 million
- 2025: ▼5.03 million
Location
- Location in Tower Hamlets

Stepney Green is a London Underground station located on Mile End Road in the Stepney neighbourhood of the London Borough of Tower Hamlets, East London. It is on the District and Hammersmith & City lines, between Whitechapel to the west and Mile End to the east. The station was opened by the Whitechapel and Bow Railway on 2 June 1902, on a new route connecting the District Railway at Whitechapel with the London, Tilbury and Southend Railway to the east of Bow Road. Steam trains were replaced by electric on 20 August 1905. Metropolitan line service commenced in 1936. It is in London fare zone 2.

== History ==
Stepney Green station was part of an unsuccessful 1883 proposal to connect the sub-surface Metropolitan Railway with the above-ground London, Tilbury and Southend Railway (LTSR). In 1897 the proposal was revived, this time with the District Railway (DR) as the sub-surface partner. The Whitechapel and Bow Railway (W&BR) opened on 2 June 1902. Stepney Green station was not ready for the first day of service and opened on 23 June 1902, with temporary buildings. The permanent structures were designed by the engineer Cuthbert Arthur Brereton. Fourth-rail electric service replaced steam trains on 20 August 1905. The station was owned by the W&BR and was initially run by a joint committee of the two companies. In 1920 the DR took over management on behalf of the owners.

The eastern section of the District line was very overcrowded by the mid 1930s. In order to relieve this, the Metropolitan line service was extended to Barking. (Note: This was achieved by diverting Metropolitan line trains that had previously been routed onto the East London Line at Whitechapel.) Stepney Green was served by a single daily Metropolitan line train from Hammersmith from 30 March 1936. This was expanded from 4 May 1936 with a service of eight trains per hour between Barking and Hammersmith at peak times. This was increased to ten trains per hour at Stepney Green from 8 May 1938. (Note: The two extra trains terminated at East Ham.) The Hammersmith service was swapped for longer Uxbridge trains from 17 July 1939, with eight trains an hour at peak times. This service was suspended on 6 October 1941 with Hammersmith trains again running to Barking.

The Transport Act 1947 provided for complete ownership of the W&BR to pass to the London Transport Executive and this took place on 23 January 1950. On 30 July 1990, the Hammersmith–Barking service of the Metropolitan line gained a separate identity as the Hammersmith & City line. From 13 December 2009, off-peak Hammersmith & City line service was extended from Whitechapel to Barking with a daily all-day service at Stepney Green.

== Design ==
The station consists of two subterranean side platforms—numbered 1 for westbound and 2 for eastbound—either side of the tracks. The station is a rare, largely-intact example of the period. The 1902 Brereton-designed buildings were identical to Mile End when opened. The platforms are 450 feet (140 m) long, built to accommodate longer LTSR trains. The screens on the eastbound platform were added when the Mile End Municipal Baths was built over the steam train vents in the early 1930s. The parcel office, which formed the leftmost bay of the street-facing building, was bombed and demolished during World War II. (Note: The parcel office was used as a retail unit after the DR parcel service was abandoned.) The exterior has brown glazed bricks below the windowsills and red brick above. The windows and doors have terracotta surrounds. The interiors have white glazed bricks and a surviving "To the trains" sign with a pointing finger. The original layout had now-disused public toilets and separate exit stairways that led to a doorway on Globe Road.

== Location ==
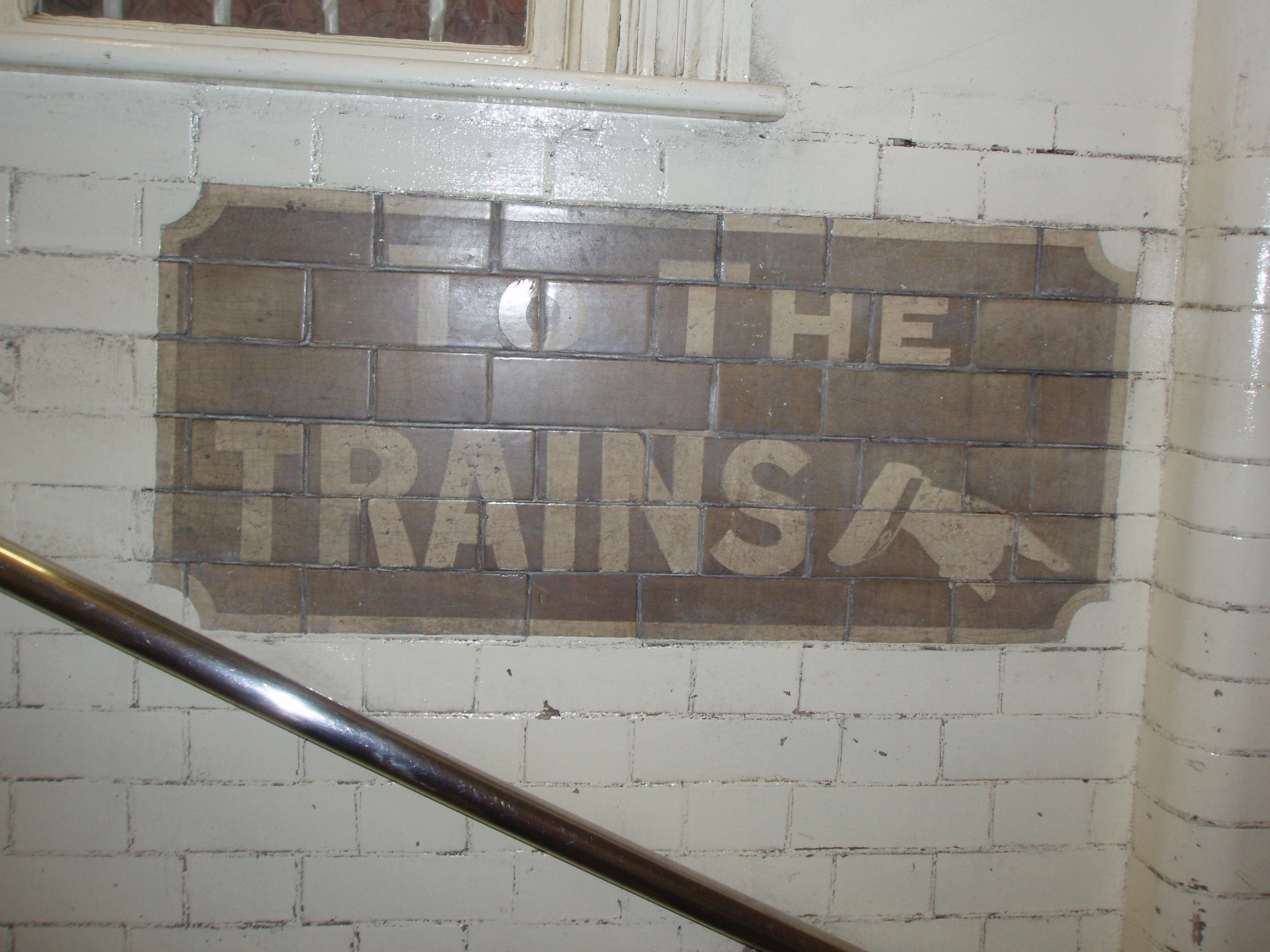
Surviving detail inside the station

The station is located on Mile End Road in the Stepney neighbourhood of the London Borough of Tower Hamlets. Day and nighttime London Buses routes serve the station.

Mile End is 1.05 kilometres (0.65 mi) to the east of the station and Whitechapel is 1 kilometre (0.62 mi) to the west. It is 2.62 kilometres (1.63 mi) along the line from Tower Hill in Central London and 22.06 kilometres (13.71 mi) from the eastern terminus at Upminster.

== Services ==
The station is managed by London Underground. It is in London fare zone 2. The typical off-peak service from the station is twelve District line trains per hour to Upminster with a further three trains to Barking. There are fifteen trains westbound to Earl's Court, of which six continue to Ealing Broadway, six continue to Richmond and three to Wimbledon. At peak periods the number of trains per hour increases. There are six Hammersmith & City line trains an hour to Barking and six to Hammersmith at all times.

Services towards central London operate from approximately 05:15 to 00:15 and services to Upminster operate from approximately 05:40 to 01:00. The journey time to Upminster is approximately 33 minutes, to Barking 16 minutes and to Tower Hill in central London 7 minutes. With 5.03 million entries and exits in 2025, it was ranked the 120th busiest London Underground station.

== Notes ==
Preceding station	London Underground	Following station
Whitechapel towards Hammersmith	Hammersmith & City line	Mile End towards Barking
Whitechapel towards Wimbledon, Richmond or Ealing Broadway	District line	Mile End towards Upminster
