= London Transport Museum =

Transport museum in London, England

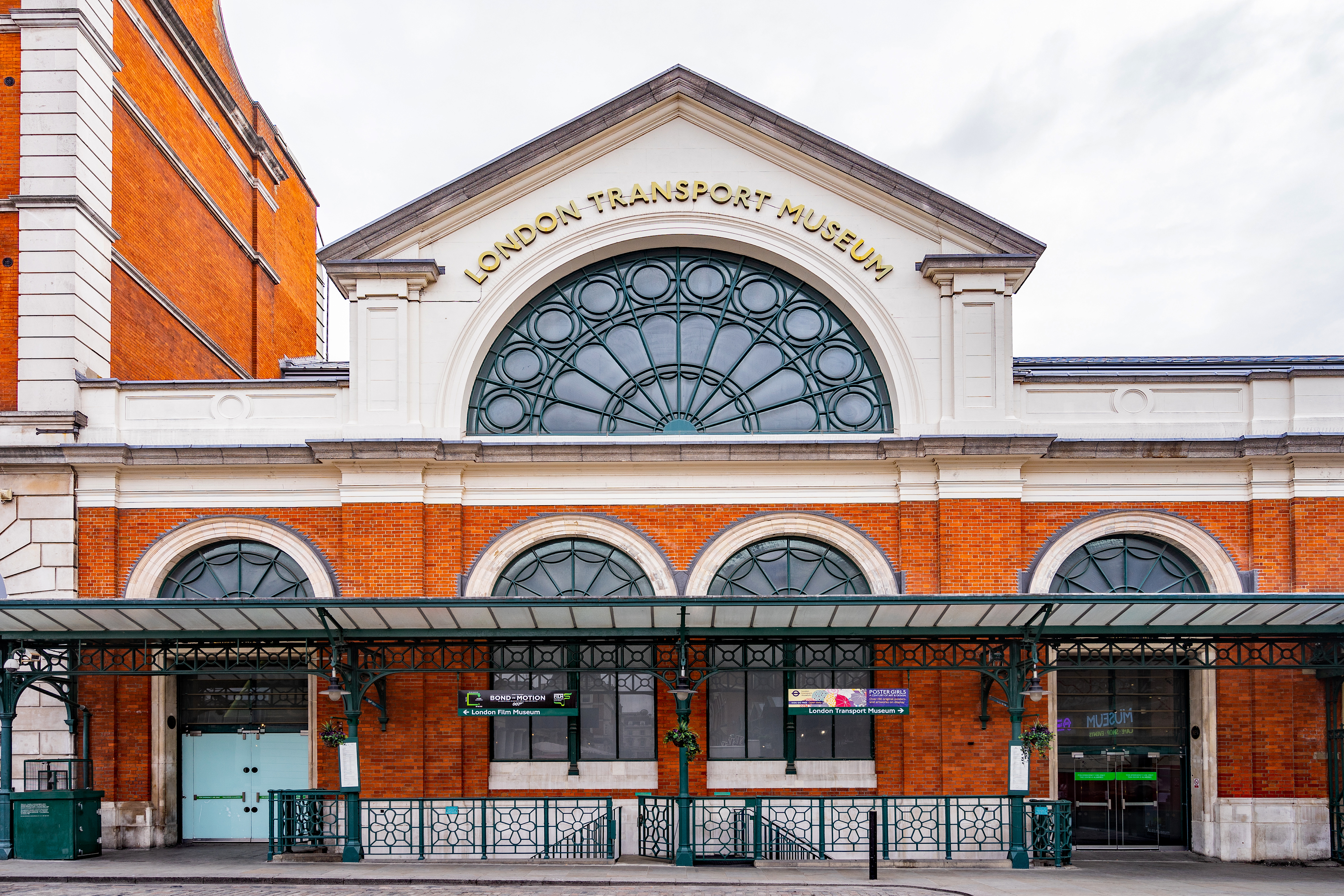
- Exterior of the London Transport Museum in 2018

- Location within City of Westminster
- Established: 1980; 46 years ago
- Location: Covent Garden; London, WC2
- Coordinates: 51°30′43″N 0°07′18″W
- Type: Transport museum
- Visitors: 449,599 (2025)
- Owner: Transport for London
- Public transit access: Covent Garden; Aldwych 11, 15, 26, 76, 172, 243, 341
- Website: www.ltmuseum.co.uk

The London Transport Museum (LTM) is a transport museum based in Covent Garden, London, England. The museum predominantly hosts exhibits relating to the heritage of London's transport, as well as conserving and explaining the history of it. The majority of the museum's exhibits originated in the collections of London Transport, but, since the creation of Transport for London (TfL) in 2000, the remit of the museum has expanded to cover all aspects of transport in the city and in some instances beyond.

The museum operates from two sites within London. The main site in Covent Garden uses the name of its parent institution, and is open to the public every day, excluding the Christmas holidays, having reopened in 2007 after a two-year refurbishment. The other site, located in Acton, is the London Transport Museum Depot and is principally a storage site of historic artefacts that is open to the public on scheduled visitor days throughout the year.

The museum also runs a programme of guided tours, Hidden London, which takes visitors to parts of the London Underground that are typically closed to the public, including disused stations and wartime shelters.

The museum was briefly renamed London's Transport Museum to reflect its coverage of topics beyond London Transport, but it reverted to its previous name in 2007 to coincide with the reopening of the Covent Garden site.

In July 2024, the Museum unveiled new branding in an attempt to reflect its coverage of all of London's transport system, not exclusively buses and trains. The new logo – still of roundel design – incorporates all the colours of TfL's transport modes.

== Museum (Covent Garden) ==
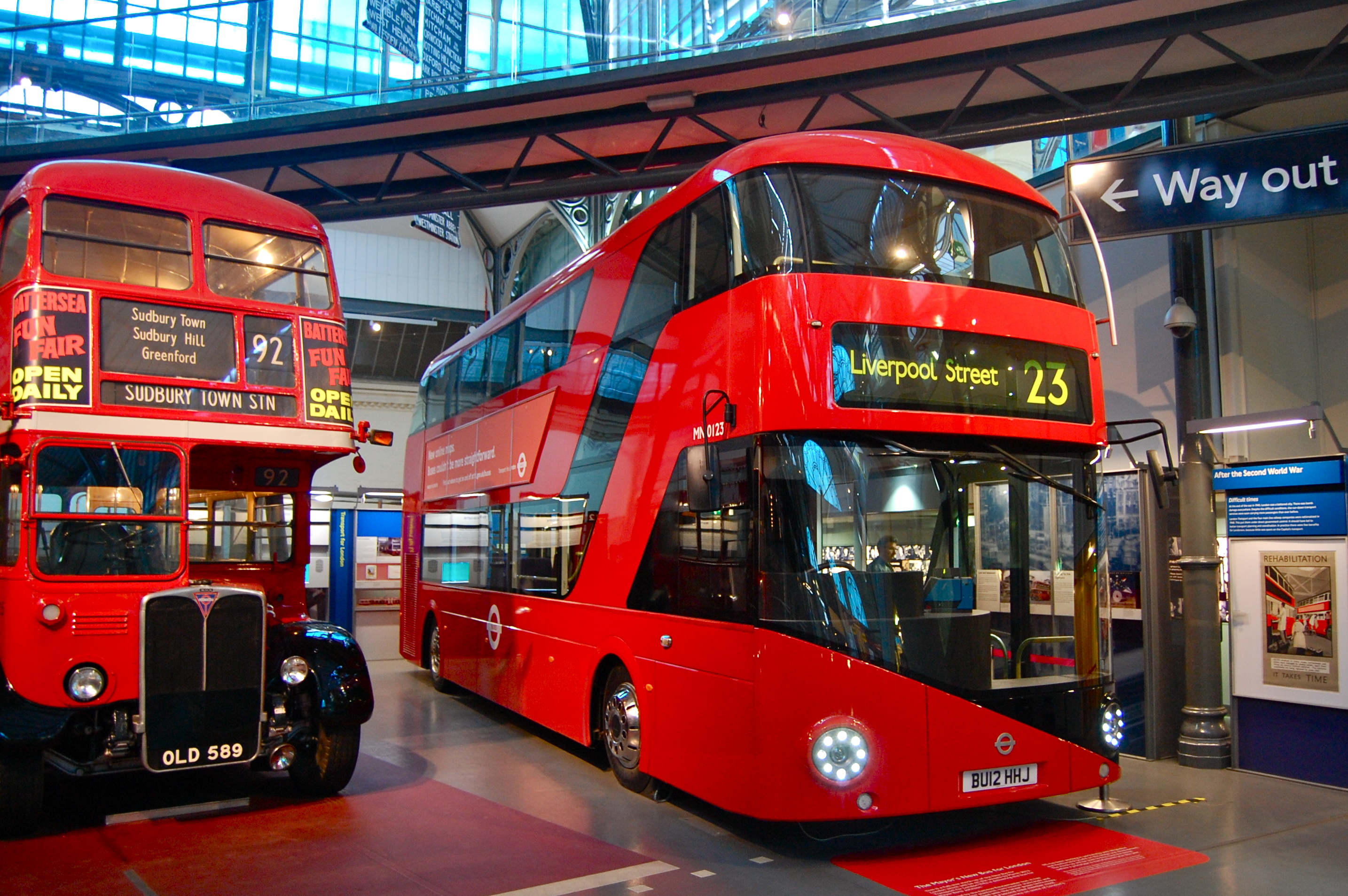
A New Routemaster bus alongside a 1954 AEC Regent III RT inside the museum

The museum's main facility is located in a Victorian iron and glass building that had formed part of the Covent Garden vegetable, fruit and flower market. It was designed as a dedicated flower market by William Rogers in 1871 and is located between Russell Street, Tavistock Street, Wellington Street and the east side of the former market square. The market moved out in 1971, and the building was reopened as the London Transport Museum on 28 March 1980. The collection had been located at Syon Park since 1973 and before that had formed part of the British Transport Museum at Clapham.

On 4 September 2005 the museum closed for a £22 million refurbishment designed by Bryan Avery of Avery Associates Architects to enable the expansion of the display collection to encompass the larger remit of TfL which administers all forms of public transport. Enhanced educational facilities were also required. The museum reopened on 22 November 2007.

The entrance to the museum is from the Covent Garden Piazza. The museum is within walking distance from both Covent Garden Underground station and Charing Cross railway station.

In June 2026, the museum announced a major refurbishment ahead of its fiftieth anniversary.

== Collection ==
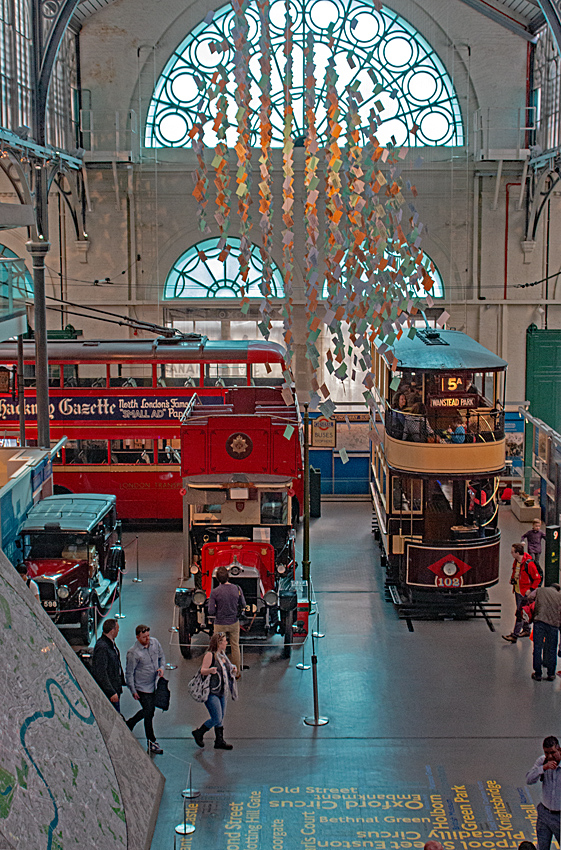
The main hall

The first parts of the collection were brought together at the beginning of the 20th century by the London General Omnibus Company (LGOC) when it began to preserve buses being retired from service.

After the LGOC was taken over by the London Electric Railway (LER), the collection was expanded to include rail vehicles. It continued to expand after the LER became part of the London Passenger Transport Board in the 1930s and as the organisation passed through various successor bodies up to TfL, London's current transport authority.

The collection has had a number of homes. It was housed as part of the Museum of British Transport at a disused tram depot in Clapham High Street (now a supermarket) from 1963 to 1972, and then at Syon Park in Brentford from 1973 to 1977, before being moved to Covent Garden in 1980.

The Covent Garden building has on display many examples of buses, trams, trolleybuses and rail vehicles from 19th and 20th centuries as well as artefacts and exhibits related to the operation and marketing of passenger services and the impact that the developing transport network has had on the city and its population. The first underground electric train, from 1890, can be seen here.

== Hidden London ==
In 2015 the museum launched a programme of guided tours under the name Hidden London. Tours of disused stations had previously been run by the museum since the 1990s, with one-off events taking place during the 2010s.

The tours give visitors exclusive access to parts of the London underground network that are usually closed to the public and cover the history of London through its underground network. They are written using findings from the museum's extensive archives and collection and open to visitors aged 10 and over.

Locations explored include disused stations Aldwych and Down Street, as well as secret parts of Piccadilly Circus and Euston stations; and a wartime deep level shelter in Clapham South. The tour also take the public into the former Jubilee line platforms at Charing Cross Underground station, closed to service in 1999 but later used as filming locations for productions including Skyfall and Paddington.

In 2023, a tour of Baker Street underground station was added to the programme in celebration of the 160th anniversary of the London Underground.. Dover Street: Alight here for Green Park, covering Green Park station was launched in 2025, and family-edition tours were launched the following year. The programme also runs a seasonal Halloween tour, which takes place at Clapham South deep level shelter.

There is also an above ground walking tour which covers the area surrounding the museum.

Profits from Hidden London tours are used to support the museum's charitable activities as an education and heritage charity.

== Other attractions ==
As of 2022, the museum offers simulator experiences including an Elizabeth line simulator featuring a cab and a 1938 stock simulator complete with deadman's handle.

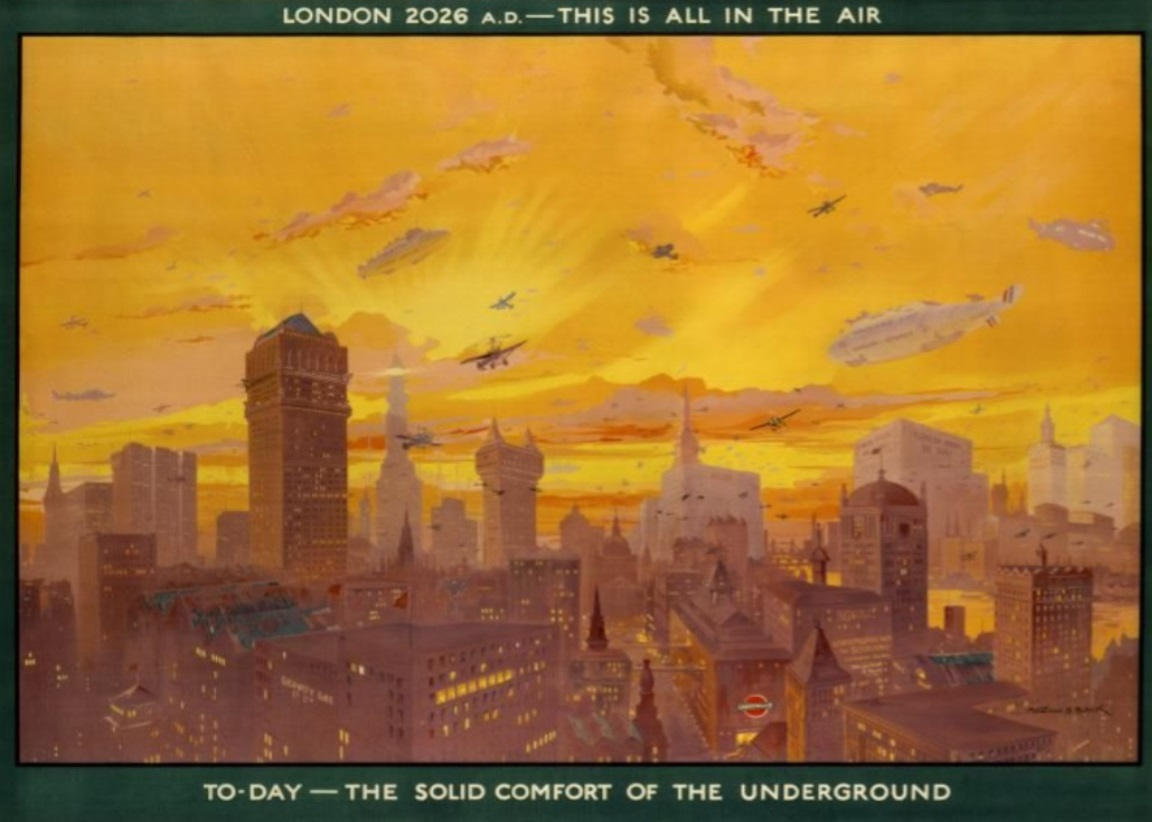
London 2026 - poster by Montague Birrell Black

A Hidden London exhibition, which ran until July 2023, featured a sized-down, walkthrough replica of the Aldwych ticket hall and Down Street Blitz shelter which Winston Churchill used during World War II.

There is the children's interactive area complete with Optare bus and the All Aboard play-zone for 0–7 year olds.

== Museum shop ==
The museum shop sells a wide range of books, reproduction posters, models, gifts and souvenirs, both at Covent Garden and online.

== Museum Depot (Acton) ==
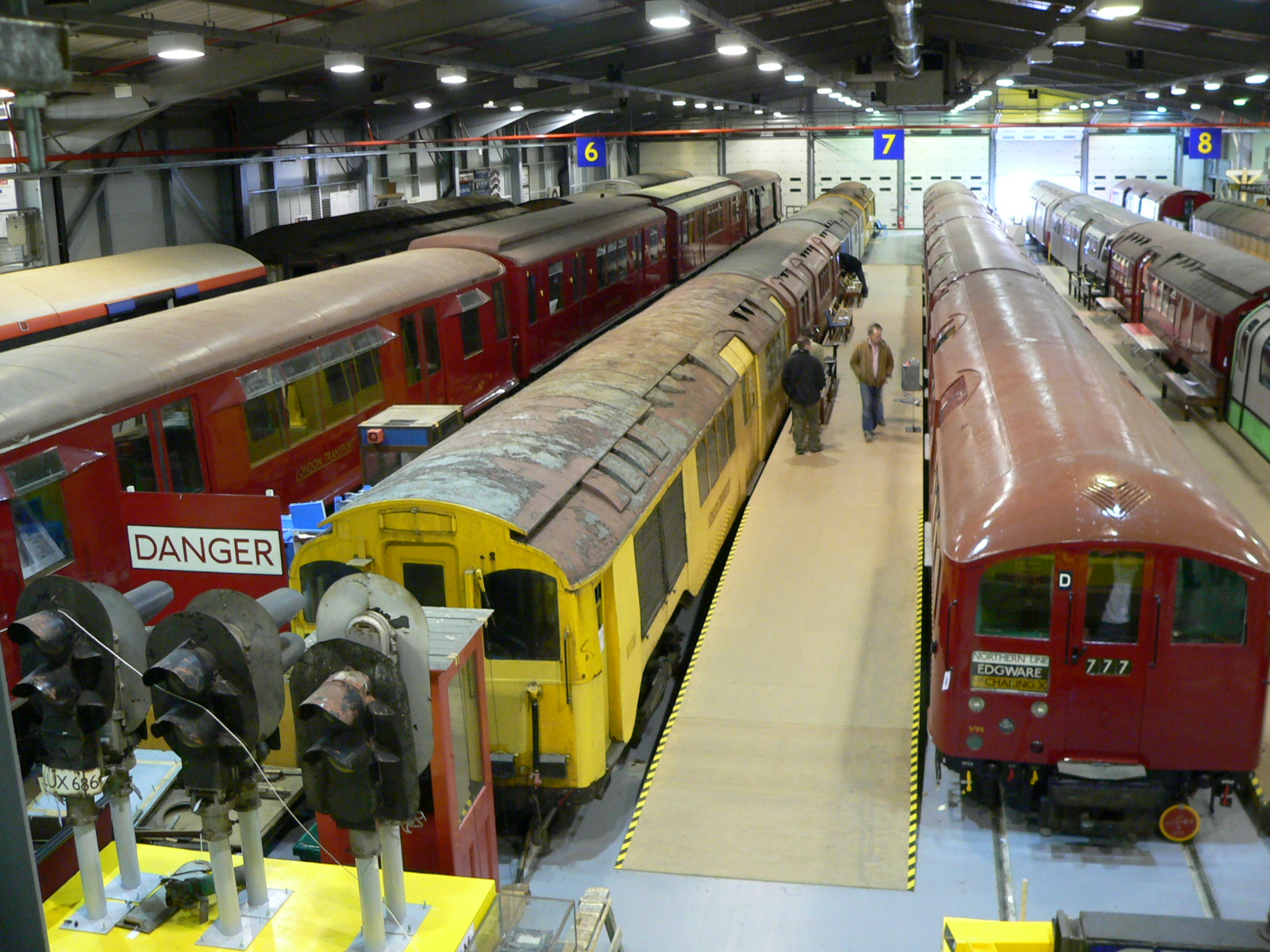
London Underground trains of different types and eras in the museum depot

The Museum Depot is located in Acton, west London, and was opened in October 1999. The depot holds the majority of the museum's collections which are not on display in the main museum in Covent Garden. It is the base for the museum's curators and conservators, and is used for the display of items too large to be accommodated in the main facility.

Larger exhibits held at Acton depot include a complete 1938 stock tube train as well as early locomotives from the first sub-surface and first deep-level lines.

The depot provides 6,000 square metres of storage space in secure, environmentally controlled conditions and houses over 370,000 items of all types, including many original works of art used for the museum's collections of posters, signs, models, photographs, engineering drawings and uniforms. The building has both road access and a rail connection to the London Underground network, which allows the storage and display of significant numbers of buses, trams, trolleybuses, rail rolling stock and other vehicles.

The depot is not regularly open to the public, but is fully equipped to receive visitors, with ticket office, shop, a miniature railway, and other visitor facilities. It opens to the public for pre-booked guided tours on several dates each month, and also for special events, including themed open weekends – usually three times per year. It is within easy walking distance of Acton Town Underground station.

== Transport links ==
Public transport access
London Buses	Aldwych 11, 15, 26, 76, 172; Aldwych 243, 341
London Underground	Covent Garden (4 min walk) Leicester Square (7 min walk); Charing Cross (5 min walk)
National Rail	Charing Cross (7 min walk)

== Gallery ==
Former logo up to 2024

Logo since 2024

== See also ==
- List of British heritage and private railways
- List of transport museums (worldwide)

Other transport museums with items from London Transport

- London Bus Museum, Brooklands
- Alderney Railway – on the Island of Alderney
- East Anglia Transport Museum – near Lowestoft
- National Railway Museum – York
- National Tramway Museum – Crich
- The Trolleybus Museum at Sandtoft – in North Lincolnshire

Other transport and industrial museums in London

- Brunel Museum
- Kew Bridge Steam Museum
- London Canal Museum
- Science Museum (London)
- Walthamstow Pump House Museum

Other major transport museums in the UK

- Black Country Living Museum
- Brooklands Museum
- Riverside Museum, Glasgow
- Museum of Transport in Manchester
- Ulster Folk and Transport Museum
- Coventry Transport Museum
- Museum of the Great Western Railway, Swindon
- National Motor Museum, Beaulieu, Hampshire

Past transport museums in the UK

- London Motorcycle Museum
- North Woolwich Old Station Museum
