= Piccadilly station =

Piccadilly station may refer to:

- Manchester Piccadilly station
- Piccadilly Circus tube station
