= GN&SR =

GN&SR may refer to:

== Transport ==
- Great Northern and Southern Railway, a fictional railway company featured in The Railway Children
- Great Northern and Strand Railway, an underground railway company in London from 1898 to 1902

== See also ==
- GNSR (Great North of Scotland Railway)
