= Montague Birrell Black =

British painter, illustrator and poster artist

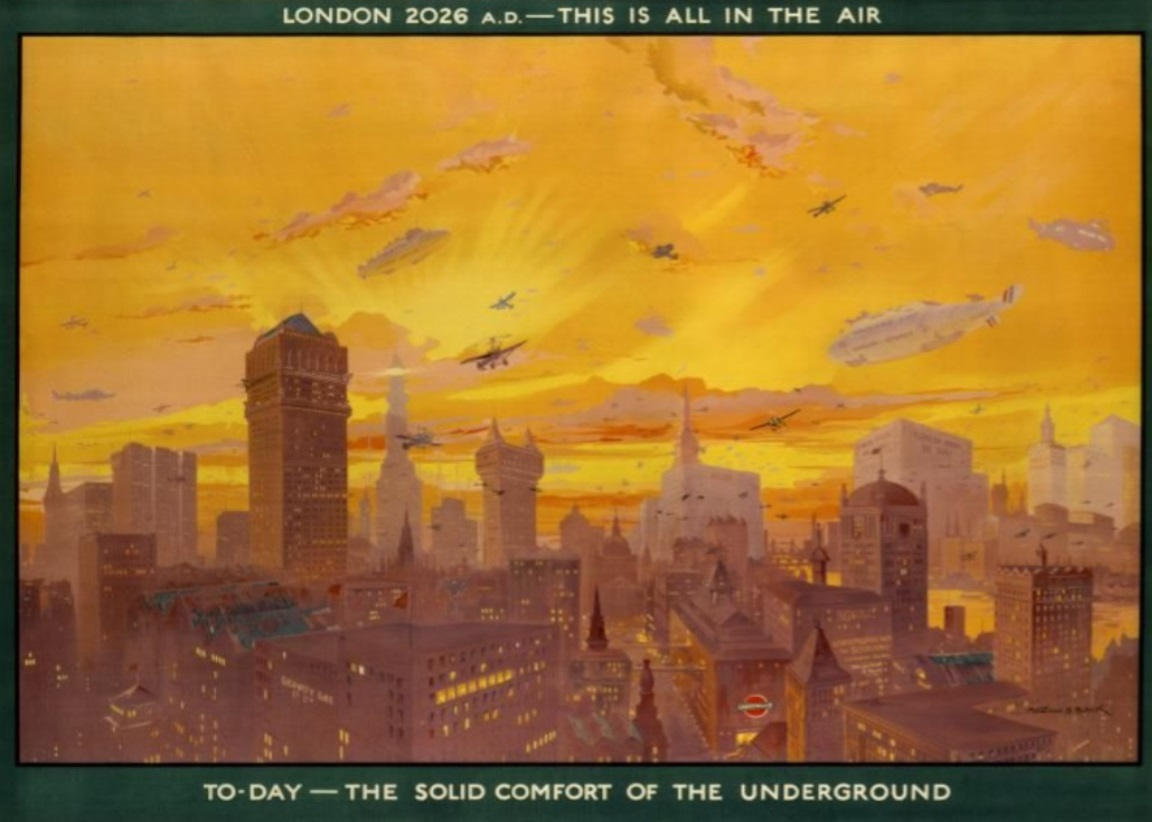
- London 2026 A.D. - This is all in the air
- Born: Montague Birrell Black; 29 March 1884; Stockwell, London
- Died: 1964 (aged 79–80); Kensington, London
- Known for: Painting; Posters; Illustration

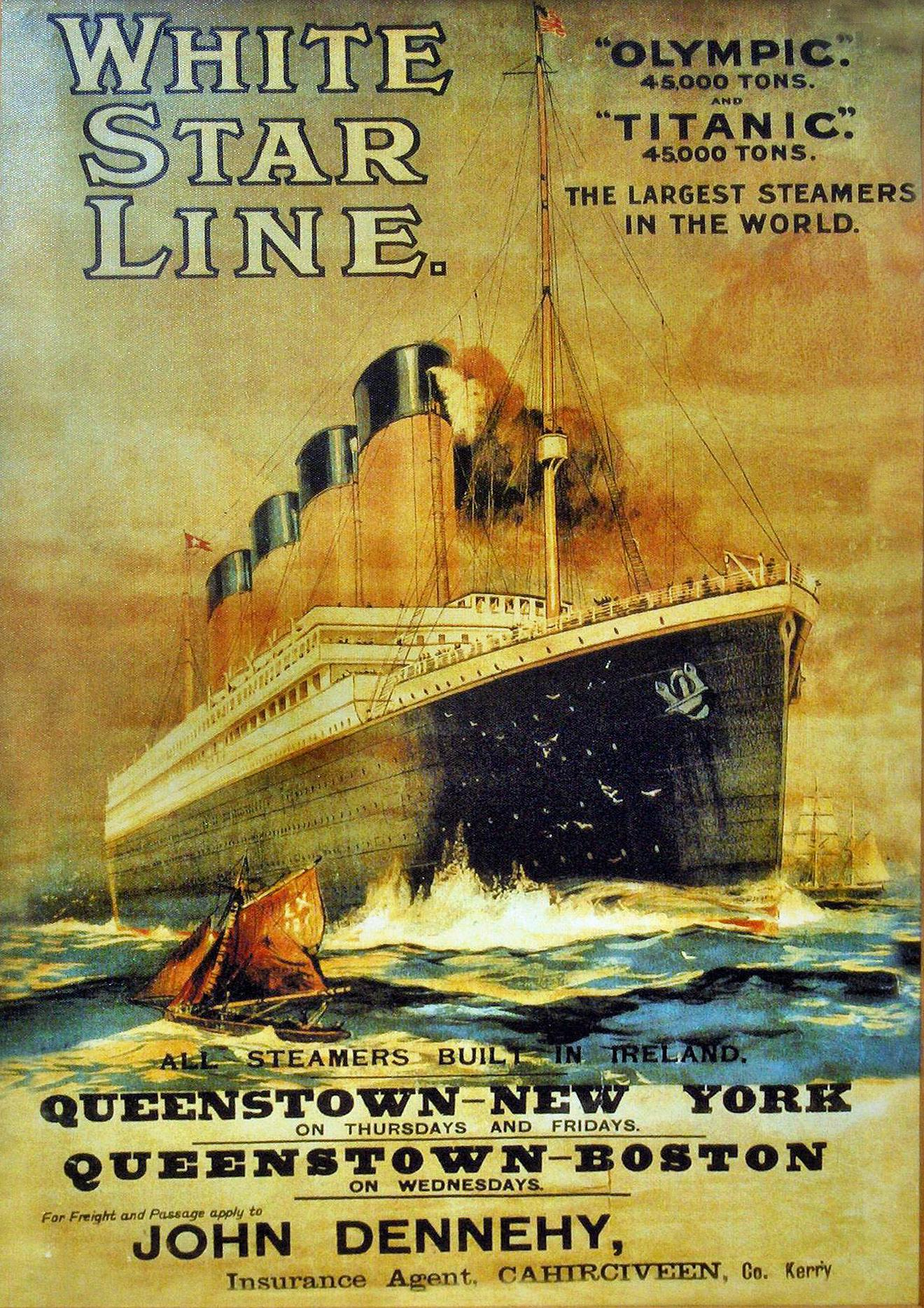
White Star Line advertisement poster

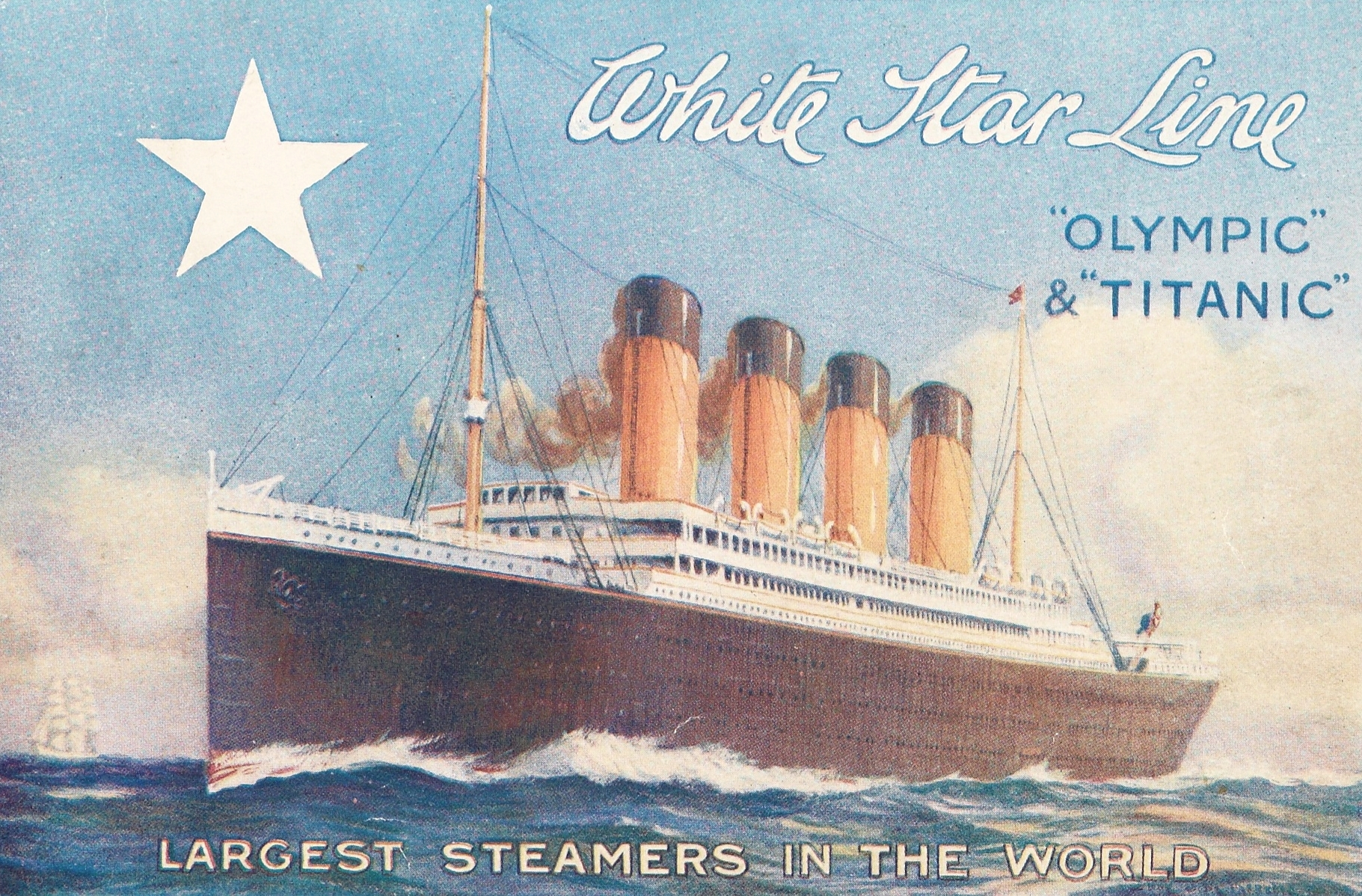
White Star Line poster

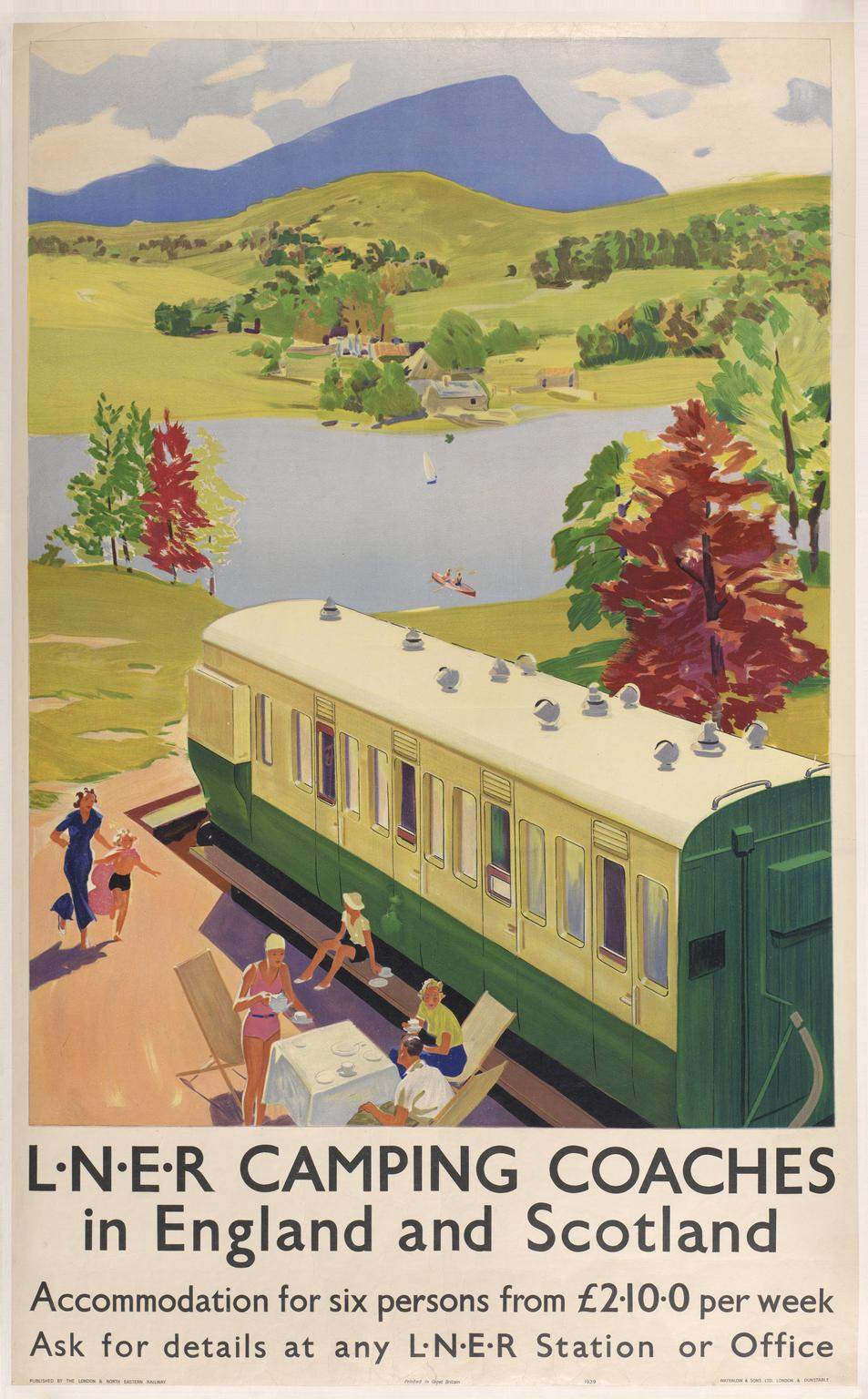
LNER poster

Montague Birrell Black (29 March 1884 – 1964) was a British painter, illustrator and poster artist, producing lithographs for the likes of White Star Line, the London Underground, and the British Railway Lines.

Born in Stockwell, London, England, on 29 March 1884, he started his career as a "Lithographic Artist" at the age of seventeen, after attending Stockwell College, in London.

Between 1910 and 1936, Black created numerous posters along with illustrations of the RMS Titanic and her sister ship RMS Olympic after the delivery of the vessels from the shipyard. He also produced decorative map posters for the British Railways and LNER.

The majority of his illustrations were commissioned and printed by companies such as The Jarrold Group, McCorquodale & Co, Jordison &Co, and The Liverpool Printing & Stationery Company.

Around 1910, a number of his paintings were registered at Stationers Hall in London for commercial use, and are now at The National Archives in the UK. In 1912, some of his paintings were exhibited at the Walker Art Gallery in Liverpool.

In 1926, he painted one of his more renowned works that is currently on display at the London Transport Museum, London, "2026 A.D. - This is all in the Air", which was designed to illustrate a future London where airships were the primary mode of transportation.

During World War II, Black was a War Correspondent for the Toronto Star in Canada, while also producing war illustrations for the front page of La Presse.

Some of his work is held at the National Railway Museum and the Library of Congress in the US. His posters, advertisements, and paintings regularly come up for sale at auction houses such as Christie's, Sotheby's, and Bonhams.

Black died in Kensington, London in 1964.
