= Covent Garden tube station =

London Underground station

Covent Garden
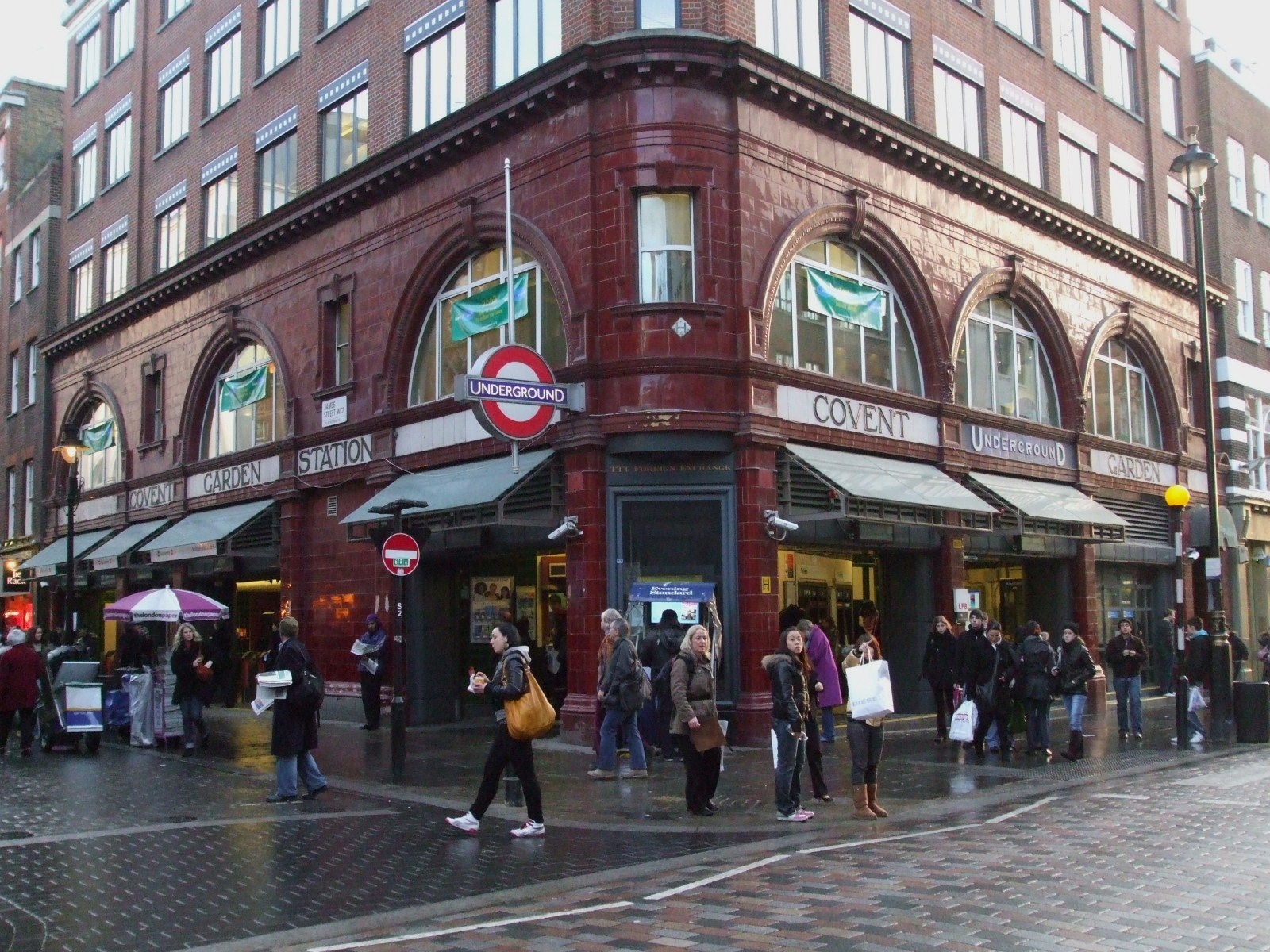
- Covent Garden station
- Interactive map of Covent Garden

General information
- Location: Covent Garden
- Local authority: City of Westminster
- Managed by: London Underground
- Number of platforms: 2
- Fare zone: 1

London Underground annual entry and exit
- 2021: ▲7.48 million
- 2022: ▲12.99 million
- 2023: ▼12.57 million
- 2024: ▲12.95 million
- 2025: ▼11.51 million

Railway companies
- Original company: Great Northern, Piccadilly and Brompton Railway

Key dates
- 15 December 1906: Line opened
- 11 April 1907: Station opened

Listed status
- Listing grade: II
- Entry number: 1401025
- Added to list: 20 July 2011

Other information
- External links: TfL station info page
- Coordinates: 51.5130°N 0.1243°W

Covent Garden (/ˈkɒvənt ˈɡɑːrdən/) is a London Underground station, serving Covent Garden and its surrounding area in the West End of London. It is on the Piccadilly line between Leicester Square and Holborn stations, and is in London fare zone 1. The station is located at the corner of Long Acre and James Street and the street-level concourse is a Grade II listed building.

== History ==
The station was planned by the Great Northern and Strand Railway (GN&SR), which had received parliamentary approval for a route from Wood Green station (now Alexandra Palace) to Strand in 1899. After the GN&SR was taken over by the Brompton and Piccadilly Circus Railway (B&PCR) in September 1901, the two companies came under the control of Charles Yerkes' Metropolitan District Electric Traction Company before being transferred to his new holding company, the Underground Electric Railways Company of London (UERL) in June 1902. To connect the two companies' planned routes, the UERL obtained permission for new tunnels between Piccadilly Circus and Holborn. The companies were formally merged as the Great Northern, Piccadilly and Brompton Railway following parliamentary approval in November 1902. The station was opened by the Great Northern, Piccadilly and Brompton Railway on 11 April 1907, four months after services on the rest of the line began operating on 15 December 1906.

In 1929, Covent Garden was suggested for closure in connection with the extension of the Piccadilly line: the elimination of less-busy stations in the central area would improve both reliability and journey times for long-distance commuters, though the closure did not proceed.

In 2011, English Heritage gave the station frontage Grade II listed status, on account of it being a good example of Leslie Green's architecture.

== The station today ==
=== Design ===
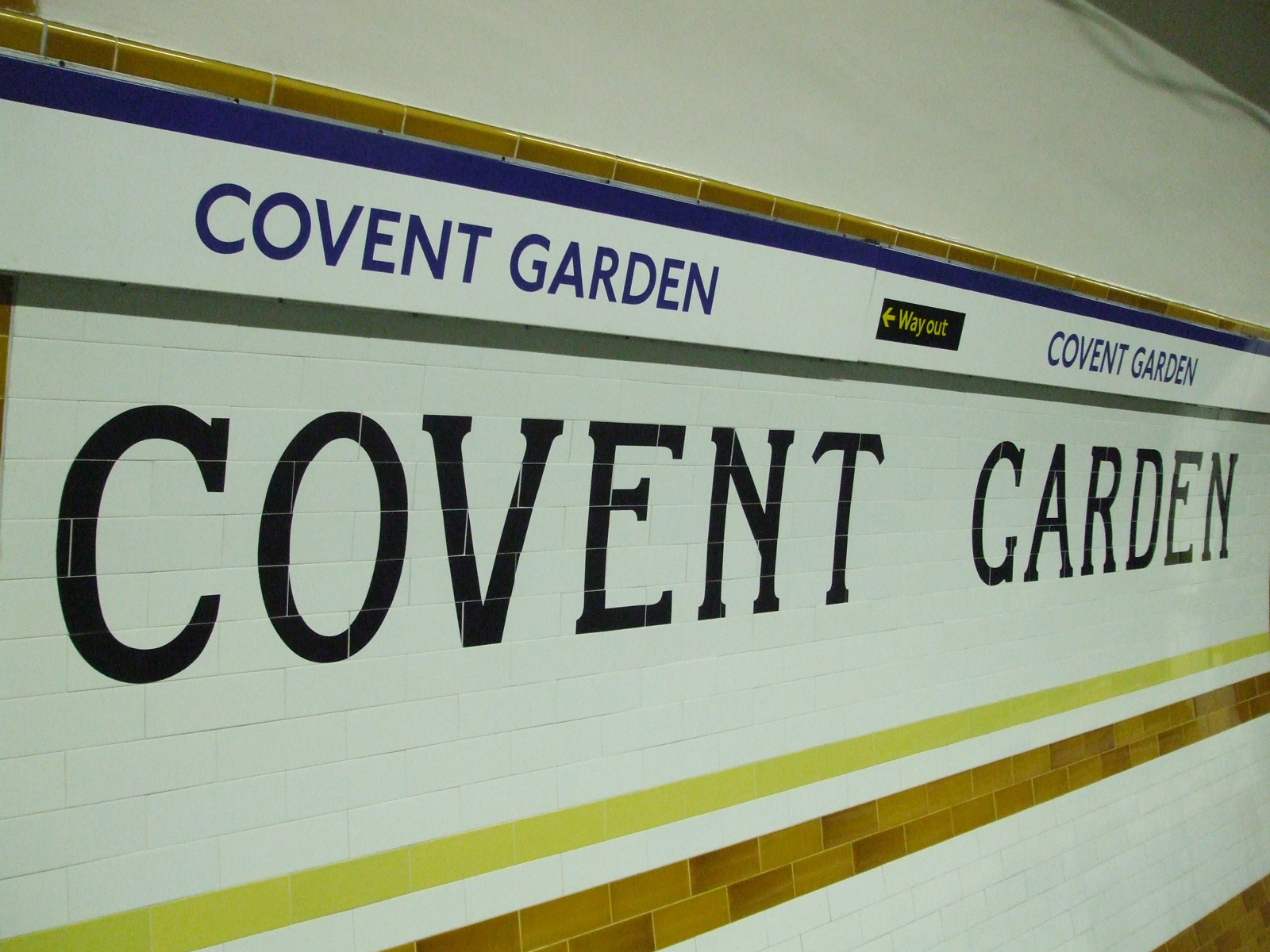
Signage on the platforms

Like the rest of the original GNP&BR stations, the street level station building and platform tiling were designed by Leslie Green in the Modern Style (British Art Nouveau style). As is commonplace with other Central London stations Green designed, the station building is a classic red 'Oxblood' building which has two elevations fronting onto the end of James Street and Long Acre. The platform wall was tiled with two shades of yellow and white tiling which formed geometric shapes along with three blank spaces to incorporate the station name. As part of Transport for London's investment programme, the ageing tiling dating back from the station's opening was replaced in 2010 in a like-for-like basis, retaining the look and feel of the platforms.

==== Platform level tiling ====
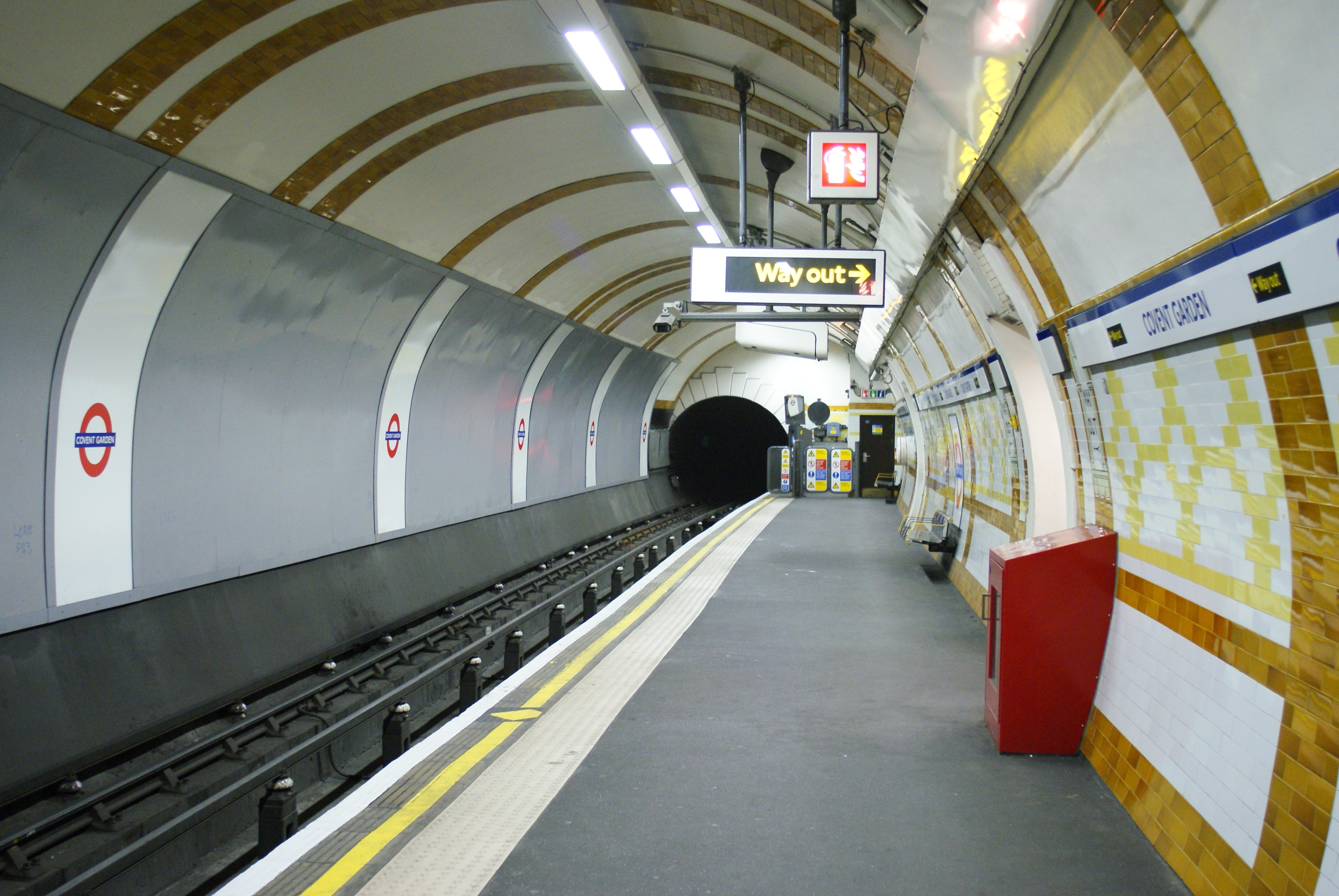
The distinctive platform level tilework

The stations along the central part of the Piccadilly line, as well as some sections of the Northern line, were financed by Charles Yerkes, and are famous for the Leslie Green designed red station buildings and distinctive platform tiling. Each station had its own unique tile pattern and colours.

=== Access ===
Covent Garden station is one of the few stations in Central London for which platform access is only by lift or an emergency spiral staircase with 193 steps. There are four lifts that give access to street level, although a final flight of stairs from the lifts to the platforms means that the station is wheelchair-inaccessible.

At the bottom of the staircase, numerous posters, warning users of the long climb ahead, suggest they make use of the station’s lifts instead.

== Proximity to Leicester Square ==
The Piccadilly line journey between Leicester Square and Covent Garden measures 260 metres (280 yd), the shortest distance between any two adjacent stations on the network. Posters at the station give details of the alternative methods of getting to and from Covent Garden using surrounding stations.

== Services ==
Covent Garden station is on the Piccadilly line in London fare zone 1. It is between Leicester Square to the west and Holborn to the east. Train frequencies vary throughout the day, but generally operate every 3–7 minutes in both directions. As a part of the Piccadilly line, the station is served by Night Tube on Friday and Saturday nights.

Preceding station	London Underground	Following station
Leicester Square towards Uxbridge, Rayners Lane or Heathrow Airport (Terminal 4 or Terminal 5)	Piccadilly line	Holborn towards Cockfosters or Arnos Grove

== Folklore ==
It is said that the ghost of actor William Terriss (murdered in 1897) haunts the station. It is claimed that he used to visit a bakery demolished when the station was built. The last reported sighting of Terriss was in 1972.

== Notes and references ==
=== Bibliography ===
- Badsey-Ellis, Antony (2005). London's Lost Tube Schemes. Capital Transport. ISBN 185414-293-3.
- Connor, J.E. (2006) [1999]. London's Disused Underground Stations (2nd ed.). Capital Transport. ISBN 1-85414-250-X.
- Rose, Douglas (1999). The London Underground, A Diagrammatic History. Douglas Rose/Capital Transport. ISBN 1-85414-219-4.
