= Leicester Square tube station =

London Underground station

Leicester Square
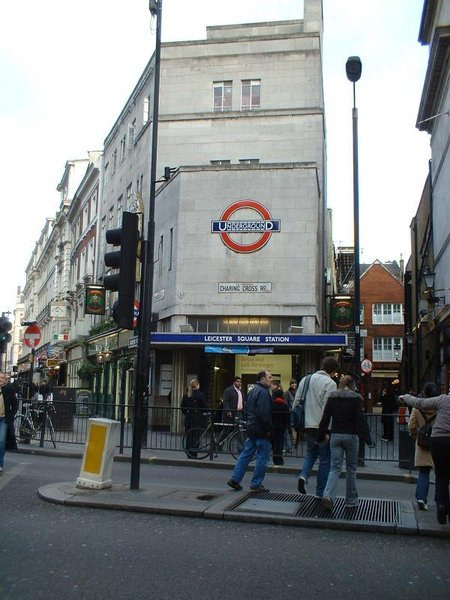
- Station entrance
- Interactive map of Leicester Square

General information
- Location: Theatreland and Chinatown
- Local authority: City of Westminster
- Managed by: London Underground
- Number of platforms: 4
- Fare zone: 1

London Underground annual entry and exit
- 2021: ▲16.35 million
- 2022: ▲29.39 million
- 2023: ▼27.38 million
- 2024: ▼26.40 million
- 2025: ▼26.34 million

Railway companies
- Original company: Great Northern, Piccadilly and Brompton Railway; Charing Cross, Euston and Hampstead Railway

Key dates
- 15 December 1906: GNP&B station opened
- 22 June 1907: CCE&H station opened

Other information
- External links: TfL station info page
- Coordinates: 51.5114°N 0.1281°W

Leicester Square (/ˈlɛstər ˈskwɛər/) is a London Underground station in the West End of London, within walking distance of Theatreland and Chinatown, as well as the southern reaches of Soho. It is located on Charing Cross Road, a short distance to the east of Leicester Square itself. The station is served by the Northern and Piccadilly lines. It is in London fare zone 1.

On the Charing Cross branch of the Northern line, the station is between Tottenham Court Road and Charing Cross stations. On the Piccadilly line, it is between Piccadilly Circus and Covent Garden stations.

== History ==
On early Tube plans, the station was listed as Cranbourn Street, but the present name was used by the Great Northern, Piccadilly and Brompton Railway when the station opened on 15 December 1906.

Like other stations on the original sections of the Piccadilly and Northern lines, the station was originally constructed with lifts providing access to the platforms. The increase in passenger numbers in the 1920s as the Northern line was extended north (to Edgware) and south (to Morden) and the expected further increase from the 1930s extensions of the Piccadilly line led to the reconstruction of the station below ground in the early 1930s. New station entrances were constructed to a new sub-surface ticket hall. As with the similar sub-surface ticket hall previously built at Piccadilly Circus, this was excavated partially under the roadway. From there banks of escalators were provided down to both sets of platforms. The redundant lifts were removed but the lift shaft remains in use as a ventilation shaft hidden behind a small door on the first landing of the Cranbourn Street entrance stairs. The redeveloped station opened in 1935.

The escalators down to the Piccadilly line (the longest in the world when opened in 1935) were the longest on the entire Underground network, being 54 m (177 ft) in length, until the rebuilding and reopening of Angel in 1992, which overtook Leicester Square with its 60 m (197 ft) escalators.

Offices above the red terracotta station building on the east side of Charing Cross Road were once occupied by the Northern line management staff but now have other functions in addition to the Northern line management, with Piccadilly line management and support functions on the first floor including a training centre. The building, known as Transad House, was occupied in its early years by the publishers of the Wisden Cricketers' Almanack and an image of cricket stumps appears above a doorway.

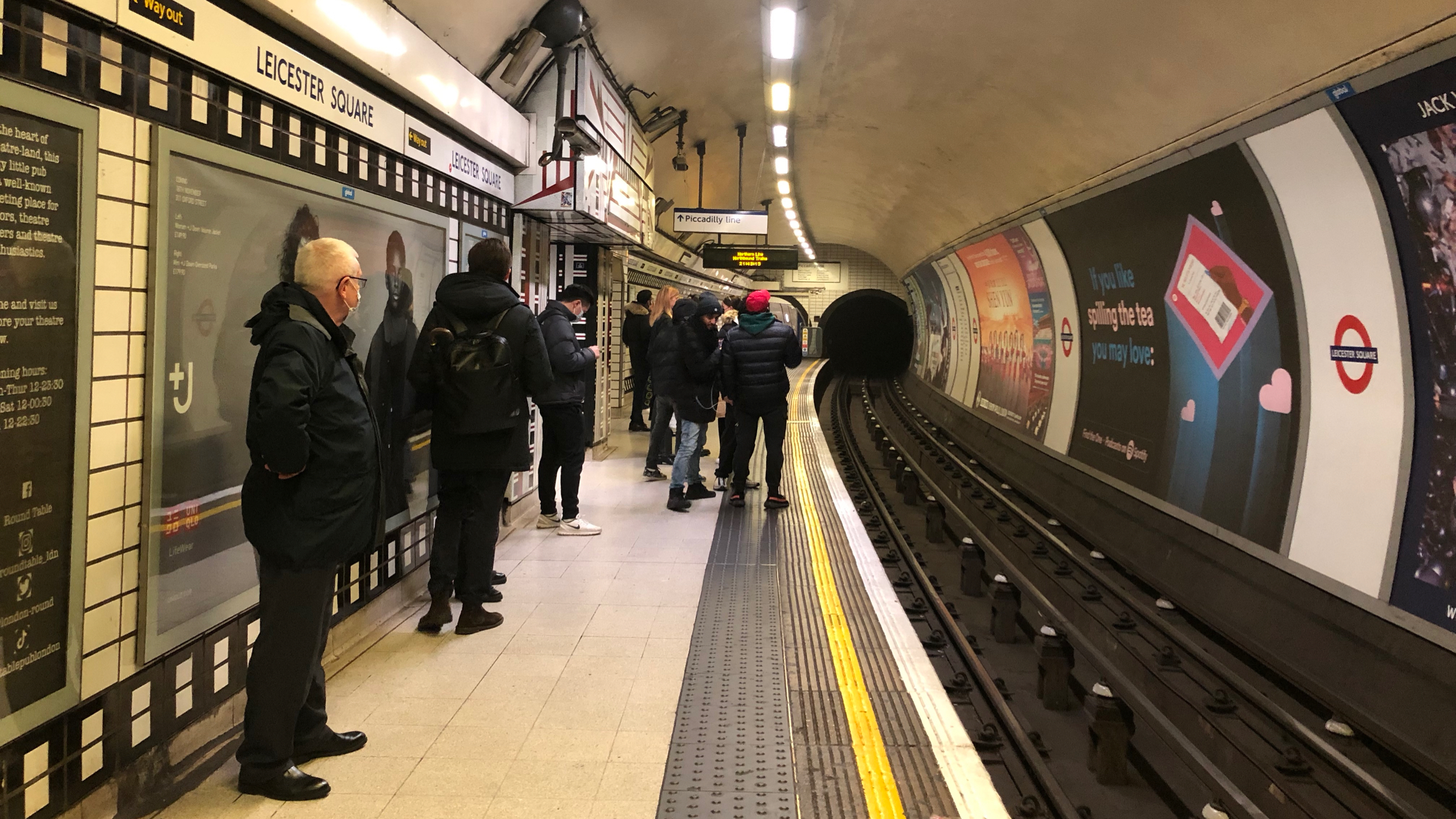
Film sprocket design on the Northern line northbound platform

On all four platforms of the station, film sprockets are painted down the entire length and on the top and bottom of the display area (black on the Northern line platforms, and dark blue on the Piccadilly line platforms), in reference to the four premiere cinemas in Leicester Square.

== Connections ==
Day and nighttime London Buses routes operate from close to the station.

== See also ==
- Leslie Green – architect of original station building
- Charles Holden – (1875–1960) architect of new ticket hall and entrances

| Preceding station | London Underground | Following station |
|---|---|---|
| Tottenham Court Road towards Edgware, Mill Hill East or High Barnet | Northern line Charing Cross branch | Charing Cross towards Battersea Power Station, Morden or Kennington |
| Piccadilly Circus towards Uxbridge, Rayners Lane or Heathrow Airport (Terminal 4 or Terminal 5) | Piccadilly line | Covent Garden towards Cockfosters or Arnos Grove |
