= Great Northern, Piccadilly and Brompton Railway =

Underground railway company in London

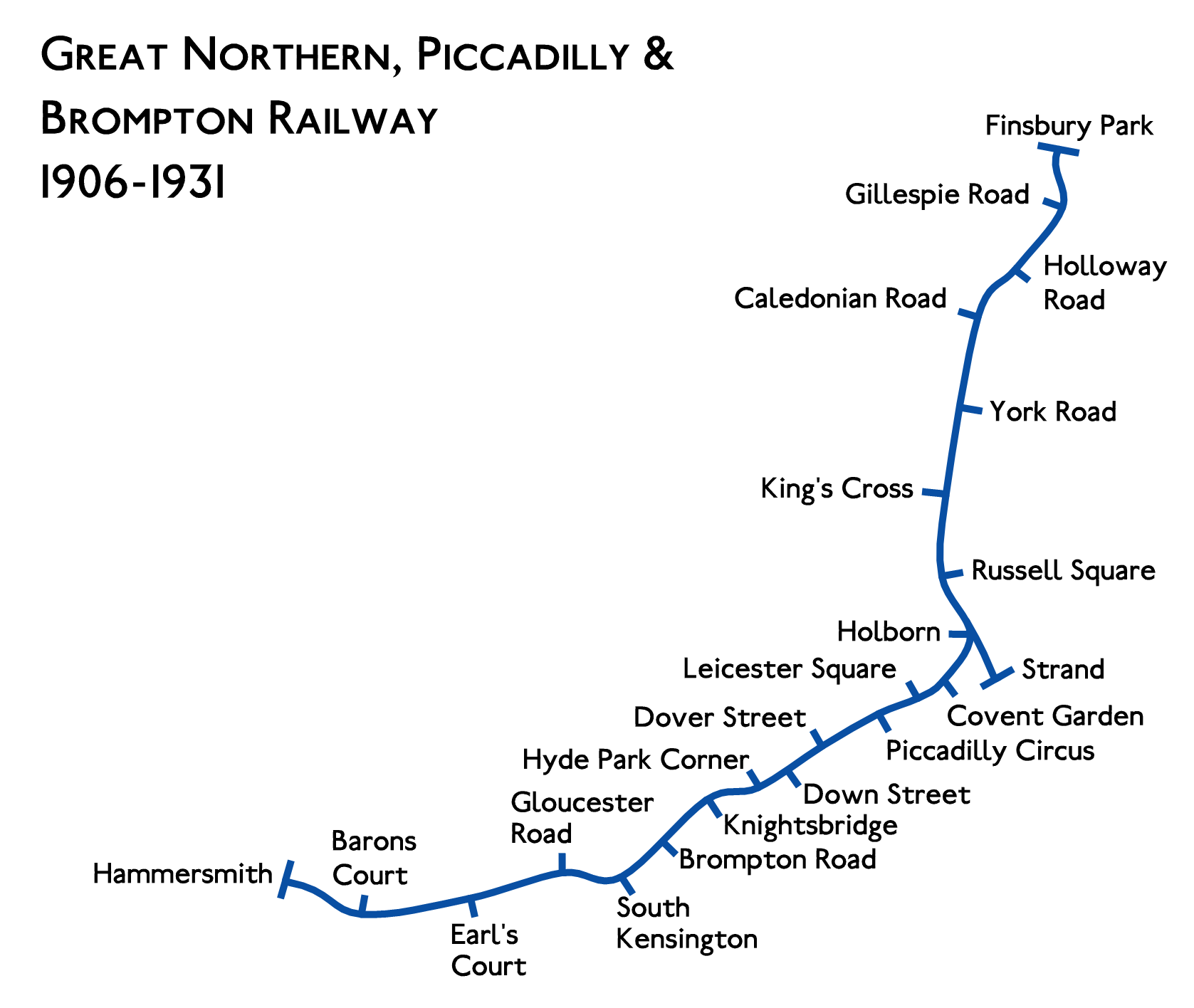
Geographic route map of the Great Northern, Piccadilly & Brompton Railway

The Great Northern, Piccadilly and Brompton Railway (GNP&BR), also known as the Piccadilly tube, was a railway company established in 1902 that constructed a deep-level underground "tube" railway in London, England. (Note: A "tube" railway is an underground railway constructed in a cylindrical tunnel by the use of a tunnelling shield, usually deep below ground level.) The GNP&BR was formed through a merger of two older companies, the Brompton and Piccadilly Circus Railway (B&PCR) and the Great Northern and Strand Railway (GN&SR). It also incorporated part of a tube route planned by a third company, the District Railway (DR). The combined company was a subsidiary of the Underground Electric Railways Company of London (UERL).

The B&PCR and the GN&SR were established in 1896 and 1898 respectively, but construction of both railways was delayed while funding was sought. In 1902 the UERL, which already controlled the DR, took control of both companies and quickly raised the funds, mainly from foreign investors. A number of different routes were planned, but most were rejected by the Parliament of the United Kingdom.

When it opened in 1906, the GNP&BR's line served 22 stations and ran for 14.17 kilometres (8.80 mi) between its western terminus at Hammersmith and its northern terminus at Finsbury Park. A short 720-metre (2,362 ft) branch connected Holborn to the Strand. Most of the route was in a pair of tunnels, with 1.1 kilometres (0.68 mi) at the western end constructed above ground. Within the first year of opening it became apparent to the management and investors that the estimated passenger numbers for the GNP&BR and the other UERL lines were over-optimistic. Despite improved integration and cooperation with the other tube railways, the GNP&BR struggled financially. In 1933 it and the rest of the UERL were taken into public ownership. Today, the GNP&BR's tunnels and stations form the core central section of the London Underground's Piccadilly line.

== Establishment ==
=== Origins ===
==== Brompton and Piccadilly Circus Railway, 1896 ====
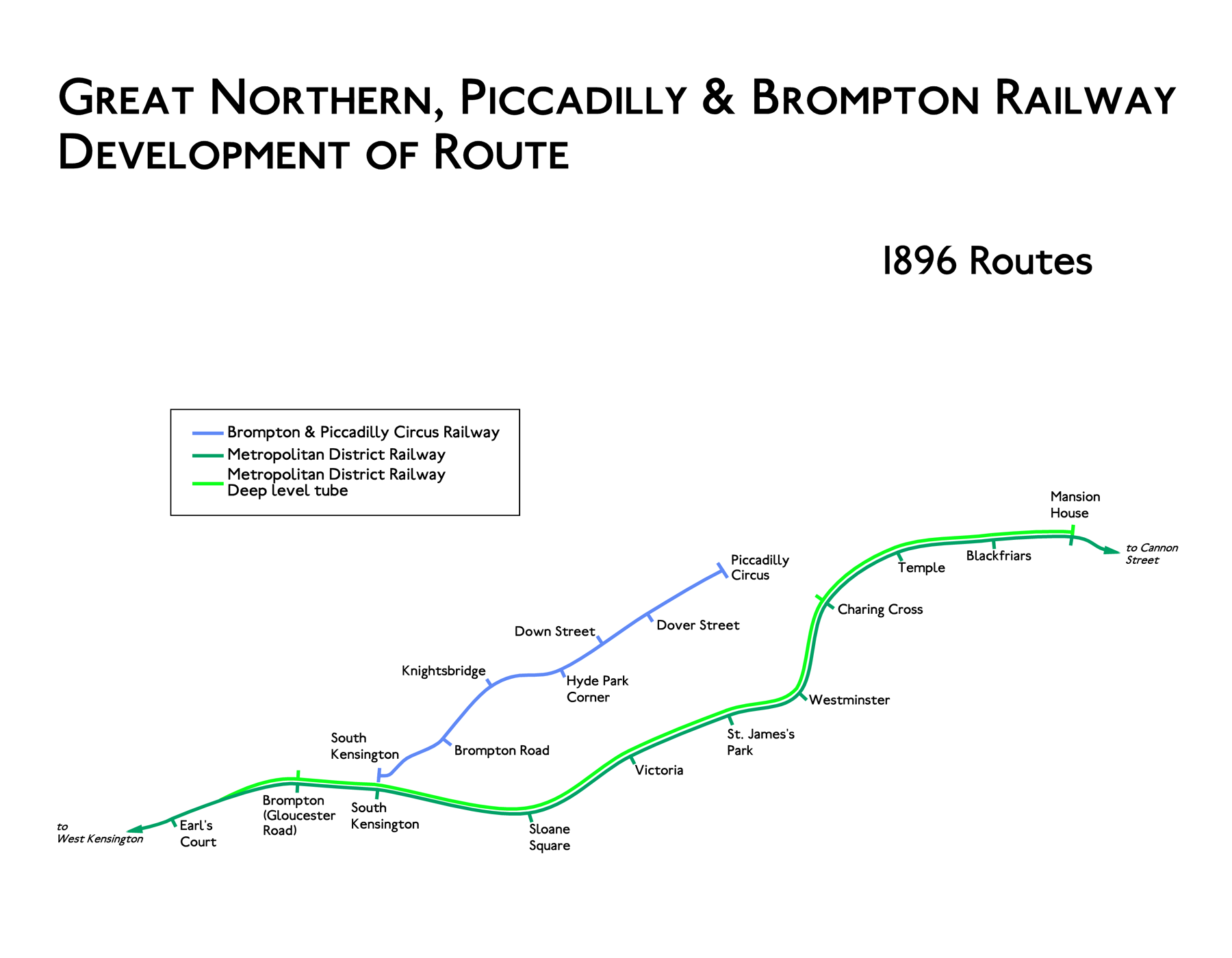
B&PCR and DR deep-level routes, 1896

Brompton and Piccadilly Circus Railway Act 1897
- Act of Parliament
- Parliament of the United Kingdom
- Long title: An Act for incorporating the Brompton and Piccadilly Circus Railway Company and for empowering them to construct an Underground Railway from Piccadilly Circus to South Kensington and for other purposes.
- Citation: 60 & 61 Vict. c. cxcii

Dates
- Royal assent: 6 August 1897
Other legislation
Amended by	Brompton and Piccadilly Circus Railway (Extensions) Act 1899; Metropolitan District Railway Act Act 1900; Brompton and Piccadilly Circus Railway Act 1902; Great Northern, Piccadilly and Brompton Railway (Various Powers) Act 1903; Great Northern, Piccadilly and Brompton Railway Act 1908; London Electric Railway Amalgamation Act 1910

Status: Amended

Text of statute as originally enacted

In November 1896 notice was published that a private bill was to be presented to Parliament for the construction of the Brompton and Piccadilly Circus Railway (B&PCR). (Note: Rules and procedures known as standing orders existed covering the presentation of private bills to Parliament and a failure to comply with these could result in a bill's rejection. Standing orders for railway bills included requirements to publish a notice of intention to submit the bill in the London Gazette in the November of the preceding year, to submit maps and plans of the route to various interested parties, to provide an estimate of the cost and to deposit 5% of the estimated cost into the Court of Chancery.) The line was planned to run entirely underground between Air Street near Piccadilly Circus and the south end of Exhibition Road, South Kensington. The route was to run beneath Piccadilly, Knightsbridge, Brompton Road and Thurloe Place, with intermediate stations at Dover Street, Down Street, Hyde Park Corner, Knightsbridge and Brompton Road. A short branch to the east of the South Kensington terminus was planned to a depot south of Brompton Road at the end of Yeoman Row. Electricity to operate the trains was to be provided from a generating station to be built about a mile south of the South Kensington terminus on the north bank of the River Thames at Lots Road, West Brompton. Having been approved by Parliament, the bill received royal assent as the Brompton and Piccadilly Circus Railway Act 1897 (60 & 61 Vict. c. cxcii) on 6 August 1897.

==== District Railway deep-level tube, 1896 ====
Metropolitan District Railway Act 1897
- Act of Parliament
- Parliament of the United Kingdom
- Long title: An Act for empowering the Metropolitan District Railway Company to construct an Underground Railway from near Earl's Court Station to the Mansion House Station City to authorise them to work that railway and their existing railway by electricity to extend the time limited for the completion of the Acton Junction Railway of the Company and for the compulsory purchase of lands for and for the completion of the Ealing and South Harrow Railway and for other purposes.
- Citation: 60 & 61 Vict. c. ccxlvii

Dates
- Royal assent: 6 August 1897
Other legislation
Amended by	Metropolitan District Railway Act 1900; Metropolitan District Railway Act 1902; Metropolitan District Railway Act 1903; Metropolitan District Railway Act 1905; Metropolitan District Railway Act 1906; London Electric Railway Amalgamation Act 1910; Metropolitan District Railway Act 1910; Metropolitan District Railway Act 1911; Metropolitan District Railway Act 1912; Metropolitan District Railway Act 1913; Metropolitan District Railway Act 1915; Central London and Metropolitan District Railway (Works) Act 1920; Central London and Metropolitan District Railway Act 1924; London Electric and Metropolitan District Railways Act 1926

Status: Amended

Also announced in November 1896 was a bill to be presented by the District Railway (DR) for a tube railway to be constructed beneath its existing sub-surface line between Gloucester Road and Mansion House stations. The DR operated a steam railway, running in cut and cover tunnels, and planned to ease congestion along its heavily used route by constructing an express line with just a single intermediate station at Charing Cross (now Embankment). The express line was to surface west of Gloucester Road and connect to the DR's existing line at Earl's Court. Since, like the B&PCR, the DR's deep tube line would be operated with electric trains, the DR planned to build a generating station adjacent to its Walham Green station (now Fulham Broadway). The bill received assent on 6 August 1897 as the Metropolitan District Railway Act 1897 (60 & 61 Vict. c. ccxlvii).

==== Great Northern and Strand Railway, 1898 ====
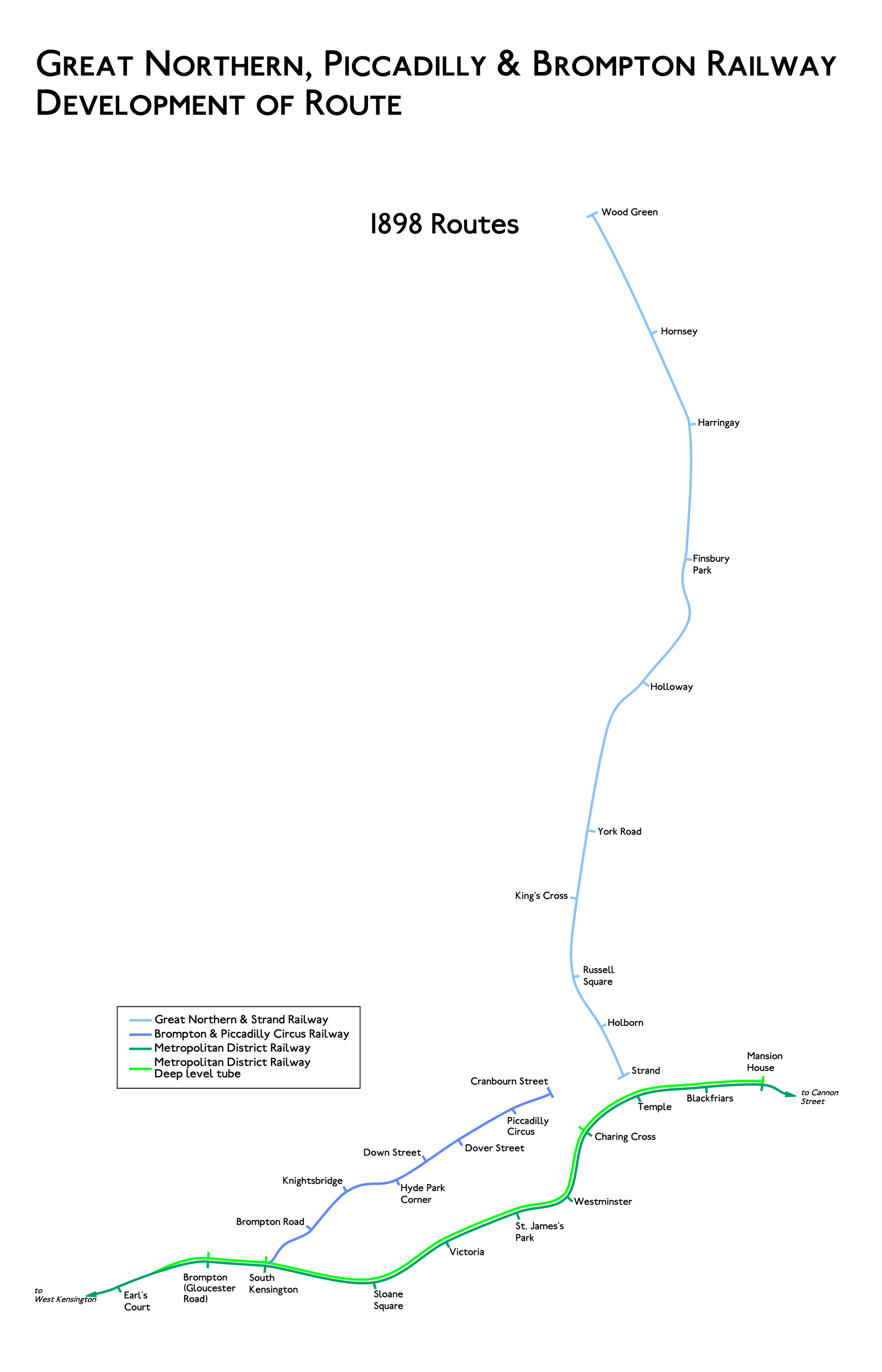
B&PCR, GN&SR and DR deep-level routes, 1898

Great Northern and Strand Railway Act 1899
- Act of Parliament
- Parliament of the United Kingdom
- Long title: An Act for incorporating the Great Northern and Strand Railway Company and for empowering them to construct an Underground Railway from the parish of Saint Clement Danes in the Administrative County of London and for other purposes.
- Citation: 62 & 63 Vict. c. cciii

Dates
- Royal assent: 1 August 1899
Other legislation
Amended by	Great Northern and Strand Railway Act 1902; Great Northern, Piccadilly and Brompton Railway (Various Powers) Act 1903; Great Northern, Piccadilly and Brompton Railway (Various Powers) Act 1905; London Electric Railway Amalgamation Act 1910

Status: Amended

In November 1898 the Great Northern and Strand Railway (GN&SR) was announced as a tube railway, to run from Wood Green to Stanhope Street, north of the Strand. The GN&SR was backed by the Great Northern Railway (GNR), the main line railway operating from King's Cross station. The GNR saw the new company as a means of relieving congestion on its route. The GN&SR was to run beneath the GNR's main line from Wood Green station (now Alexandra Palace) to Finsbury Park station. It was then planned to run south-west through Holloway to King's Cross, and then south to Bloomsbury and Holborn. Intermediate stations were planned at the GNR's Hornsey, Harringay and Finsbury Park stations, and at Holloway, York Road, King's Cross, Russell Square and Holborn. A power station was planned next to the GNR's tracks at Gillespie Road. When the London County Council planned the construction of Kingsway and Aldwych, Stanhope Street was scheduled for demolition so the southern terminus was relocated to the junction of the two new roads. The bill was enacted on 1 August 1899 as the Great Northern and Strand Railway Act 1899 (62 & 63 Vict. c. cciii).

=== Search for finance, 1896–1903 ===
Although the three companies had permission to construct their railways, they still had to raise the capital for the construction works in a competitive market.

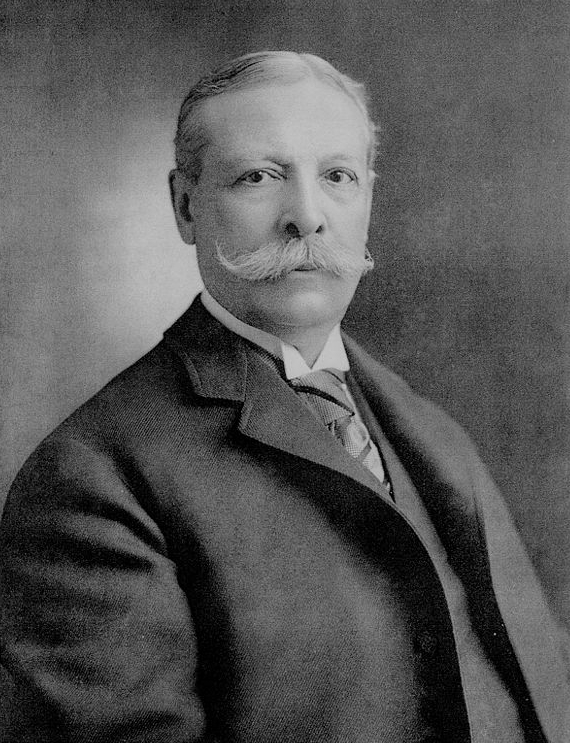
Financier Charles Yerkes' consortium bought the DR, the B&PCR, and the GN&SR in 1901.

By 1899, there were five other tube railway companies with permission to construct railways that were raising funds – the Baker Street and Waterloo Railway (BS&WR), the Charing Cross, Euston and Hampstead Railway (CCE&HR), the Great Northern and City Railway (GN&CR), the Central London Railway (CLR) and the City and Brixton Railway. (Note: The Central London Railway received permission in 1891, the Great Northern and City Railway received permission in 1892, the Baker Street and Waterloo Railway and Charing Cross, Euston and Hampstead Railway received permissions in 1893 and the City and Brixton Railway received permission in 1898.) The already operating City & South London Railway (C&SLR) was also looking for money for extensions to its existing route and numerous others proposed, but unapproved underground railway companies were also seeking investors.

Foreign investors came to the rescue of the DR, B&PCR and GN&SR: American financier Charles Yerkes, who had been lucratively involved in the development of Chicago's tramway system in the 1880s and 1890s, saw the opportunity to make similar investments in London. In March 1901 he and his backers purchased a majority of the shares of the DR and, in September 1901, took over the B&PCR and the GN&SR. (Note: Yerkes' consortium had first purchased the CCE&HR in September 1900, and also took over the BS&WR in March 1902.) With the companies under his control, Yerkes established the UERL to raise funds to build the tube railways and to electrify the DR. The UERL was capitalised at £5 million with the majority of shares sold to overseas investors. (Note: Yerkes was Chairman of the UERL with the other main investors being investment banks Speyer Brothers (London), Speyer & Co. (New York) and Old Colony Trust Company (Boston).) Further share issues followed, which raised a total of £18 million by 1903 (equivalent to approximately £1.89 billion today) for use across all of the UERL's projects. (Note: Like many of Yerkes' schemes in the United States, the structure of the UERL's finances was highly complex and involved the use of novel financial instruments linked to future earnings. Over-optimistic expectations of passenger usage meant that many investors failed to receive the returns expected.)

=== Planning the route, 1898–1905 ===
==== B&PCR bill, 1899 ====
Brompton and Piccadilly Circus Railway (Extensions) Act 1899
- Act of Parliament
- Parliament of the United Kingdom
- Long title: An Act to confer further powers on the Brompton and Piccadilly Circus Railway Company for the construction of extension railways and works in the county of London and for other purposes.
- Citation: 62 & 63 Vict. c. cclxii

Dates
- Royal assent: 9 August 1899
Other legislation
Amended by	Brompton and Piccadilly Circus Railway Act 1902; London Electric Railway Amalgamation Act 1910

Status: Amended

During the progress of their 1896 bills through parliament, the DR and the B&PCR established a relationship through a successful joint campaign of opposition to a competing proposal from the City & West End Railway. This was for a tube railway running from Hammersmith to Cannon Street, which would have duplicated parts of the DR's and the B&PCR's approved routes. In late 1898, this common interest led to the purchase of the B&PCR by the DR. In November 1898 a bill for the B&PCR was announced, which sought permission for short extensions at each end of its route: at its eastern end, from Piccadilly Circus to Cranbourn Street and, at the western end, connections between the B&PCR's tunnels and those of the DR's deep tube line. Parliament rejected the eastern extension, but permitted the connection between the two lines and approved a capital injection from the DR into the B&PCR. The bill received royal assent on 9 August 1899 as the Brompton and Piccadilly Circus Railway (Extensions) Act 1899 (62 & 63 Vict. c. cclxii).

==== DR and B&PCR bills, 1900 ====
Metropolitan District Railway Act 1900
- Act of Parliament
- Parliament of the United Kingdom
- Long title: An Act for empowering the Metropolitan District Railway Company to erect a station for generating electrical energy and thereby work certain railways to acquire lands to extend the time for the completion of certain railways and compulsory purchase of lands to make certain provisions with respect to the Ealing and South Harrow and Brompton and Piccadilly Circus Railways to raise further capital and for other purposes.
- Citation: 63 & 64 Vict. c. cclxxiii

Dates
- Royal assent: 6 August 1900
Other legislation
Amended by	Metropolitan District Railway Act 1902; Metropolitan District Railway Act 1903; Metropolitan District Railway Act 1906; London Electric Railway Amalgamation Act 1910; City and South London Railway Act 1923; London Electric Railway Act 1923

Status: Amended

In November 1899, the DR published a notice of a bill for the 1900 parliamentary session. The company was still unable to proceed with the construction of its proposed deep line, and the new bill included provisions for extensions of time for this line and for those of the B&PCR. The bill included construction and operation of the power station at the Lots Road site previously chosen by the B&PCR. The B&PCR also published notice for a bill requesting an extension of time, but this was later withdrawn and the extension request in the DR bill was used. The time extensions were granted in the Metropolitan District Railway Act 1900 (63 & 64 Vict. c. cclxxiii), which received assent on 6 August 1900.

==== B&PCR bill, 1901 ====
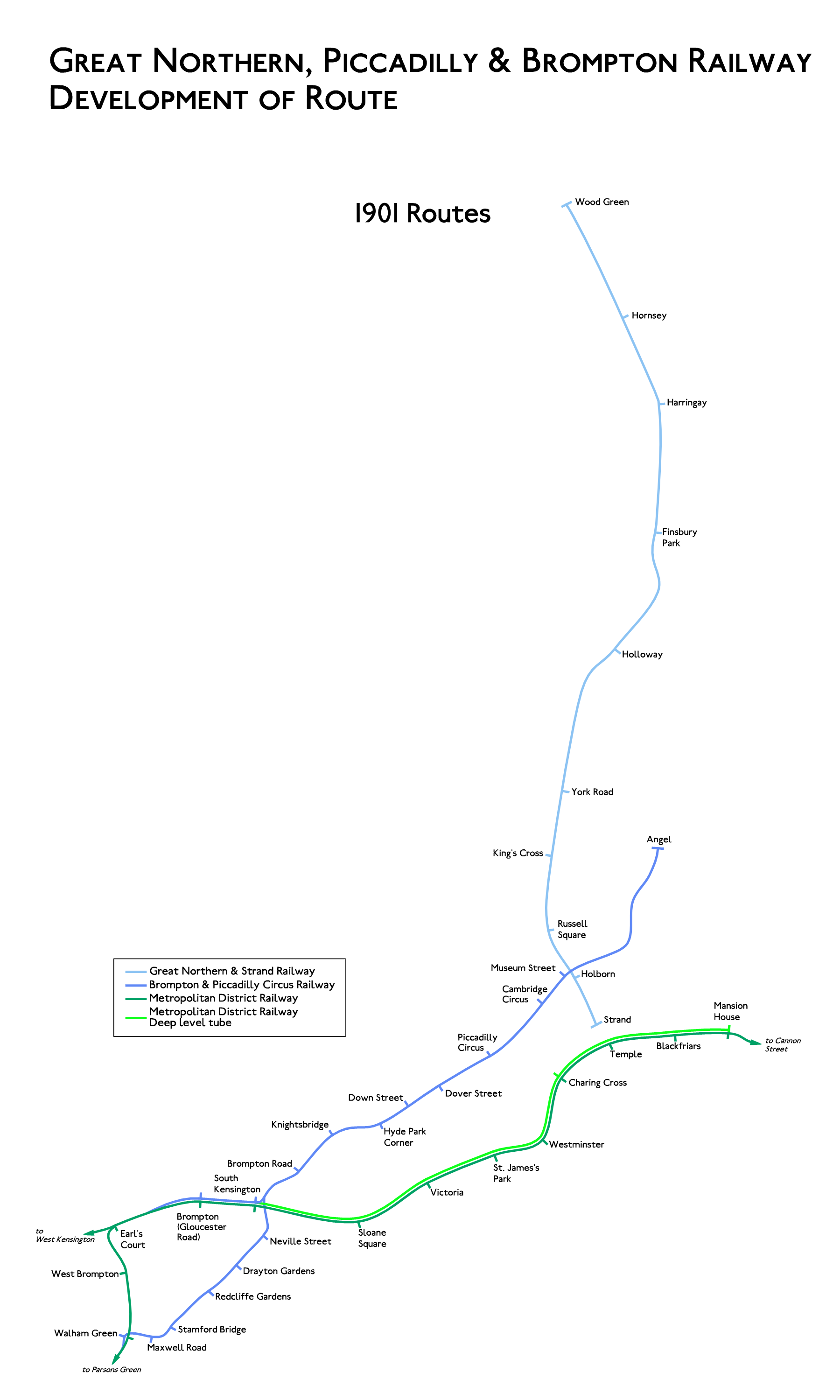
B&PCR, GN&SR and DR deep-level routes, 1901

In November 1900, the B&PCR published a notice of a bill for the 1901 session, in which it sought permission for two extensions. The first, eastward, took a more northerly route than the rejected 1899 extension to Cranbourn Street: it was to run via Shaftesbury Avenue, Hart Street (now Bloomsbury Way), Bloomsbury Square, Theobalds Road and Rosebery Avenue, to Angel, Islington where it terminated under Islington High Street. Where the line crossed other tube routes, stations were planned: at Cambridge Circus to interchange with the planned CCE&HR, and at Museum Street near to the CLR's recently opened British Museum station. The second extension took the line south-west from South Kensington, via Fulham Road, to connect to the DR's line south of Walham Green station (now Fulham Broadway). The bill also included provisions for the B&PCR to take over responsibility for construction of the section of the DR's deep-level line from South Kensington to Earl's Court, and for a further extension of time.

The opening of the CLR on 30 July 1900 had stimulated interest in underground railways, and the B&PCR's bill was submitted to Parliament at the same time as a large number of other bills for tube lines in the capital. (Note: In addition to bills for extensions to existing tube railways, bills for seven new tube railways were submitted to Parliament in 1901. While a number received royal assent, none were built.) To review these bills, Parliament established a joint committee under Lord Windsor. Only the part of B&PCR's first extension as far as Museum Street was considered by the committee. The section to The Angel was held back, pending the findings of a separate committee which was investigating problems of vibration experienced on the CLR. (Note: When the CLR opened, it used heavy unsprung electric locomotives to pull the carriages. These caused significant vibrations on the surface which led to complaints from property owners and occupiers along its route. A committee headed by Lord Rayleigh examined the problem.) The extension to Fulham was not discussed. By the time the committee had produced its report, the parliamentary session was almost over so the promoters of the bills were asked to resubmit them for the following 1902 session.

==== B&PCR, GN&SR and DR bills, 1902 ====
In November 1901, the B&PCR published details of its bill for the 1902 session. The extension to The Angel was dropped, and a different route eastwards from Piccadilly Circus was planned. Once again this ran to Cranbourn Street, but it continued under Long Acre and Great Queen Street to meet and connect to the GN&SR's tunnels at Little Queen Street (now the northern part of Kingsway) just south of the GN&SR's planned Holborn station. The B&PCR planned stations at Wardour Street, Cranbourn Street and Covent Garden.

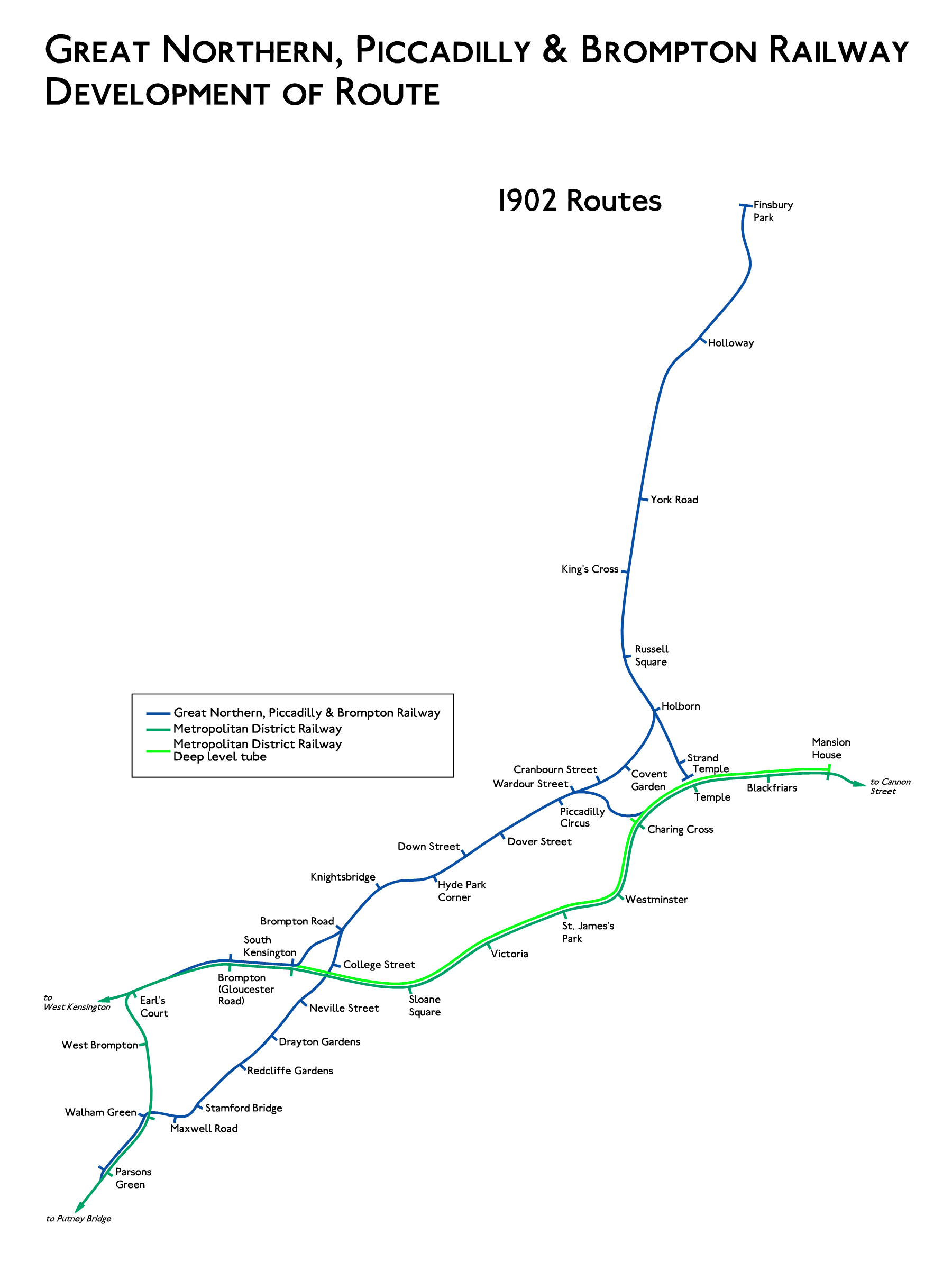
GNP&BR and DR deep-level routes, 1902

At Wardour Street station a branch was to leave the main route and head south-east, to connect to the DR's deep-level line east of its station at Charing Cross. Wardour Street station was planned to have platforms on both branches. The south-west extension to Walham Green was retained with minor alterations. The new route was to branch from the original route east of Brompton Road station, which was to have platforms on both routes. Stations were planned along Fulham Road at its junctions with College Street (now Elystan Street), Neville Street, Drayton Gardens, Redcliffe Gardens, Stamford Bridge and Maxwell Road. The route would interchange with the DR at Walham Green before coming to the surface and running parallel with the DR as far as Parsons Green, beyond which the line was to connect to the DR. The requests for an extension of time and for the powers to build the DR deep-level line from South Kensington to Earl's Court were re-presented. As the B&PCR and the GN&SR were now in common ownership, the bill also sought powers to enable the companies to merge and for the B&PCR to change its name.

At the same time, the GN&SR published details of its bill for the 1902 session. The GN&SR sought powers for a short extension of about 350 metres (1,148 ft) from its southern terminus, to Temple station on the DR's existing sub-surface line where an interchange was planned. The GN&SR also sought permission to abandon the section of its route north of Finsbury Park, (Note: As part of the deal by which Yerkes purchased the GN&SR, the GNR imposed a condition that the GN&SR's planned route from Finsbury Park to Wood Green be abandoned and that GNR would build the GN&SR's terminus below ground.) and to transfer its powers and obligations to the B&PCR as part of the merger. The DR also announced a bill for 1902 which included provisions to transfer responsibility for part or all of its deep-level line to the B&PCR.

The B&PCR bill was again examined by a joint committee under Lord Windsor. The GN&SR bill was examined by a separate committee under Lord Ribblesdale. (Note: The Windsor committee examined bills for tube railways on an east-west alignment, and the Ribblesdale committee examined bills for tube railways on a north-south alignment.) The B&PCR's eastward extension to Holborn to connect to the GN&SR was permitted, but the extension to Parsons Green was rejected following objections from hospitals in the Fulham Road, which were concerned that vibrations from trains might affect their patients. The B&PCR link from Piccadilly Circus to Charing Cross was rejected on the grounds that it involved sharp turns and steep gradients to avoid public buildings in the area. The merger with the GN&SR and name change were permitted. The GN&SR's extension to Temple was rejected following objections from the Duke of Norfolk who owned the land under which it would have run. The abandonment of the route north of Finsbury Park was permitted.

Great Northern and Strand Railway Act 1902
- Act of Parliament
- Parliament of the United Kingdom
- Long title: An Act to authorise the alteration of the railways of the Great Northern and Strand Railway Company and the transfer of their undertaking and powers to the Brompton and Piccadilly Circus Railway Company and for other purposes.
- Citation: 2 Edw. 7. c. ccxxxv

Dates
- Royal assent: 8 August 1902
Other legislation
Amended by	Great Northern, Piccadilly and Brompton Railway (Various Powers) Act 1903; London Electric Railway Amalgamation Act 1910

Text of statute as originally enacted

Brompton and Piccadilly Circus Railway Act 1902
- Act of Parliament
- Parliament of the United Kingdom
- Long title: An Act to confer further powers on the Brompton and Piccadilly Circus Railway Company for the construction of new railways and works and for the use of part of the Metropolitan District Railway to extend the time for compulsory purchase of land and completion of works and to authorise working and other agreements with other companies and for other purposes.
- Citation: 2 Edw. 7. c. cclix

Dates
- Royal assent: 18 November 1902
Other legislation
Amended by	Great Northern, Piccadilly and Brompton Railway (Various Powers) Act 1903; Great Northern, Piccadilly and Brompton Railway (Various Powers) Act 1905; Great Northern Piccadilly and Brompton Railway Act 1908; London Electric Railway Amalgamation Act 1910

Text of statute as originally enacted

The bills received royal assent as the Great Northern and Strand Railway Act 1902 (2 Edw. 7. c. ccxxxv) and the Metropolitan District Railway Act 1902 (2 Edw. 7. c. ccxx) on 8 August 1902, and as the Brompton and Piccadilly Circus Railway Act 1902 (2 Edw. 7. c. cclix) on 18 November 1902.

==== GNP&BR and DR bills, 1903 ====
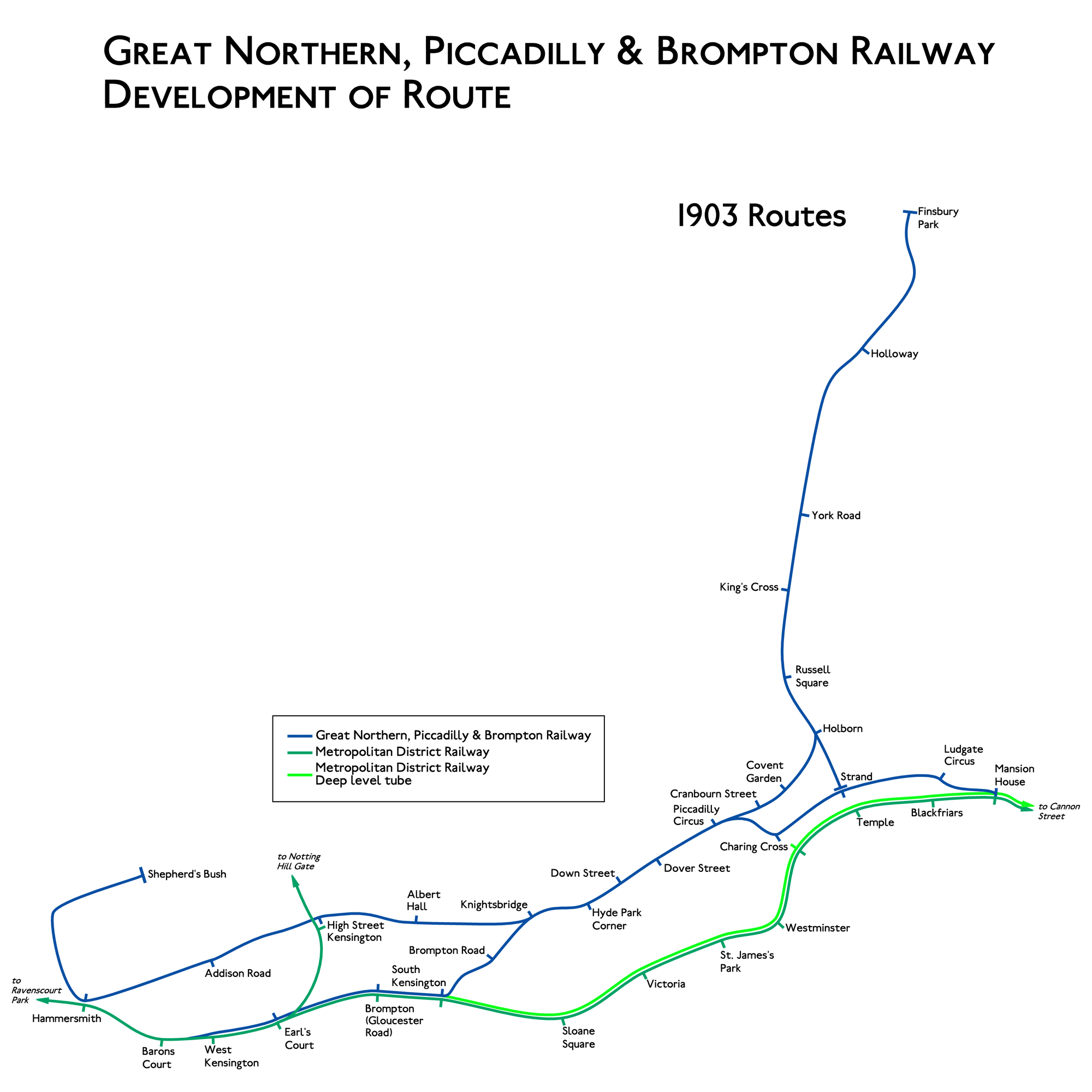
GNP&BR and DR deep-level routes, 1903

In November 1902, the newly merged company announced two bills for the 1903 parliamentary session under the GNP&BR name. The first bill requested minor powers which included the purchase of additional land for stations, and sought minor amendments to previous Acts.

The second bill sought permission for extensions east and west from the approved route. The eastern extension was to diverge from the main route immediately west of Piccadilly Circus station, which was to be expanded to have east and westbound platforms on both lines. The extension was then to pass under Leicester Square to a station at Charing Cross. Continuing eastwards under Strand, the tunnels were to cross under the branch from Holborn, with an interchange at Strand station. The line was then to continue under Fleet Street to Ludgate Circus, where a station was to be constructed to interchange with the London, Chatham and Dover Railway's Ludgate Hill station (since demolished). It would then proceed south under New Bridge Street, and east under Queen Victoria Street, to connect to the DR's proposed deep-level line west of Mansion House station. The western extension was to diverge from the approved route at Albert Gate, east of Knightsbridge station. This station was to have additional platforms on the new branch line which would head west under Knightsbridge, Kensington Road and Kensington High Street, with stations at the Royal Albert Hall, the DR's High Street Kensington station and Addison Road. The tunnels were then to follow Hammersmith Road to the DR's Hammersmith station. There they would turn north under Hammersmith Grove and east under Goldhawk Road, to terminate on the south side of Shepherd's Bush Green near to the CLR's Shepherd's Bush terminus.

The DR also publicised two further bills for the 1903 session. The first included provisions to formalise the agreement for the GNP&BR to build the section of the deep-level line between South Kensington and West Kensington, including the deep-level platforms at Earl's Court. The second bill sought permission to extend the deep-level line from its eastern end at Mansion House by following beneath the existing sub-surface tracks to Whitechapel, where the line would connect to the existing sub-surface lines to Mile End.

Great Northern, Piccadilly and Brompton Railway (Various Powers) Act 1903
- Act of Parliament
- Parliament of the United Kingdom
- Long title: An Act to confer further powers on the Great Northern Piccadilly and Brompton Railway Company and for other purposes.
- Citation: 3 Edw. 7. c. clxxxvi

Dates
- Royal assent: 11 August 1903

Text of statute as originally enacted

Neither extension bill was debated. In February 1903, Parliament had established the Royal Commission on London Traffic to assess the manner in which transport in London should be developed. While the Commission deliberated, any review of bills for new lines and extensions was postponed. Both bills were later withdrawn by their promoters. The powers bills were approved as the Metropolitan District Railway Act 1903 (3 Edw. 7. c. cxxvi) on 21 July 1903 and the Great Northern, Piccadilly and Brompton Railway (Various Powers) Act 1903 (3 Edw. 7. c. clxxxvi) on 11 August 1903.

==== GNP&BR bills, 1905 ====
The royal commission investigations continued from 1903 to early 1905, concluding with the issue of a report in June 1905. No bills were submitted for the 1904 parliamentary session, but in November 1904 the GNP&BR announced two bills for the 1905 session.

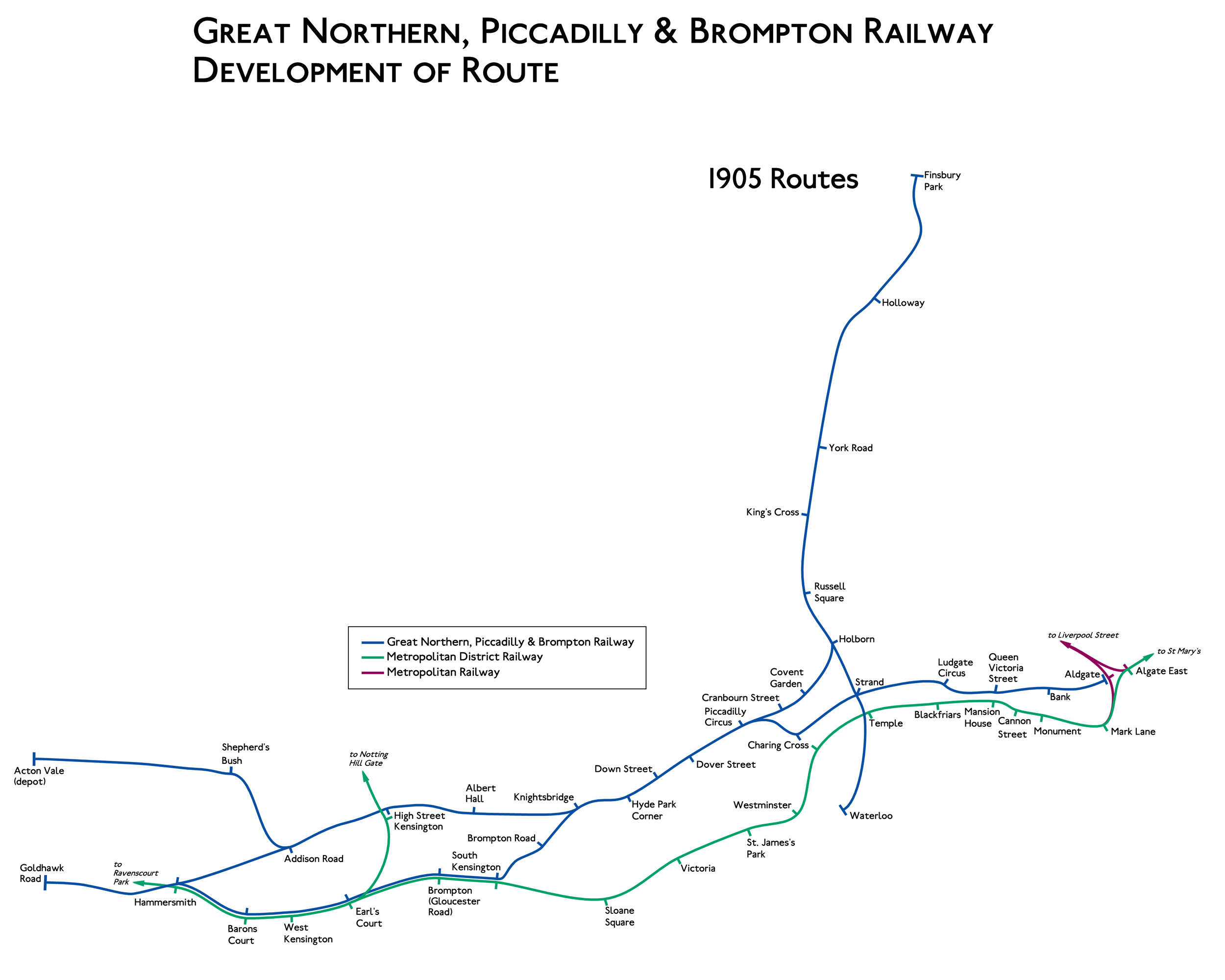
GNP&BR and DR routes, 1905

Great Northern, Piccadilly and Brompton Railway (Various Powers) Act 1905
- Act of Parliament
- Parliament of the United Kingdom
- Long title: An Act to confer further powers on the Great Northern Piccadilly and Brompton Railway Company.
- Citation: 5 Edw. 7. c. clxiii

Dates
- Royal assent: 4 August 1905
Other legislation
Amended by	London Electric Railway Amalgamation Act 1910

Text of statute as originally enacted

The first dealt with the Strand branch: it confirmed the layout of the junction between the branch and the main route at Holborn, and sought powers to extend the branch south under the River Thames to the London and South Western Railway's (L&SWR's) terminus at Waterloo station. The extension included moving Strand station to the corner of Surrey Street, and constructing a single tunnel from there to the BS&WR's Waterloo station which would be provided with additional lifts to serve the GNP&BR's platforms. The branch was to be operated as a shuttle with trains passing at Strand station. The junction layout and short extension to re-site Strand station were permitted, but not the extension to Waterloo. The bill received royal assent on 4 August 1905 as the Great Northern, Piccadilly and Brompton Railway (Various Powers) Act 1905 (5 Edw. 7. c. clxiii).

The second bill again proposed extensions to the east and west, modifying the 1903 plans. In the east, the route was the same as the previous proposal as far as Ludgate Circus. Then, instead of heading south under New Bridge Street and east into Queen Victoria Street to connect to the DR deep level route, the 1905 proposal followed under Carter Lane and Cannon Street to a station at the junction of Queen Street and Watling Street, a short distance north-east of the DR's Mansion House station. The route then followed Queen Victoria Street to Lombard Street where an interchange was to be provided with the C&SLR and the CLR at Bank station. The route continued under Cornhill and Leadenhall Street to end at Aldgate High Street, adjacent to the DR's Aldgate station.

To the west, the 1903 proposed extension from Knightsbridge to Hammersmith via Kensington High Street remained, but it was to continue beyond Hammersmith under King Street, the final station being at the junction of King Street, Goldhawk Road and Chiswick High Road. The tunnels were to continue beyond the final station for a further 350 metres (1,148 ft) under Chiswick High Road, to end at the junction with Homefield Road. The loop north from Hammersmith to Shepherd's Bush was dropped; instead a more direct route to Shepherd's Bush was proposed as a branch from the Hammersmith extension at Addison Road. It was to run under Holland Road to Shepherd's Bush Green, with a station being constructed opposite the CLR station there. It would then continue west under Uxbridge Road to Acton Vale, where a depot was to be built on the surface between Agnes Road and Davis Road. To cover the cost of the proposed extensions, powers to raise further capital of £4.2 million were sought. The review of the bill in Parliament was delayed as the Royal Commission was still sitting during the first half of 1905; the bill was withdrawn by the GNP&BR in July 1905, as insufficient time then remained for completion the parliamentary process before the end of the session.

=== Construction, 1902–1906 ===
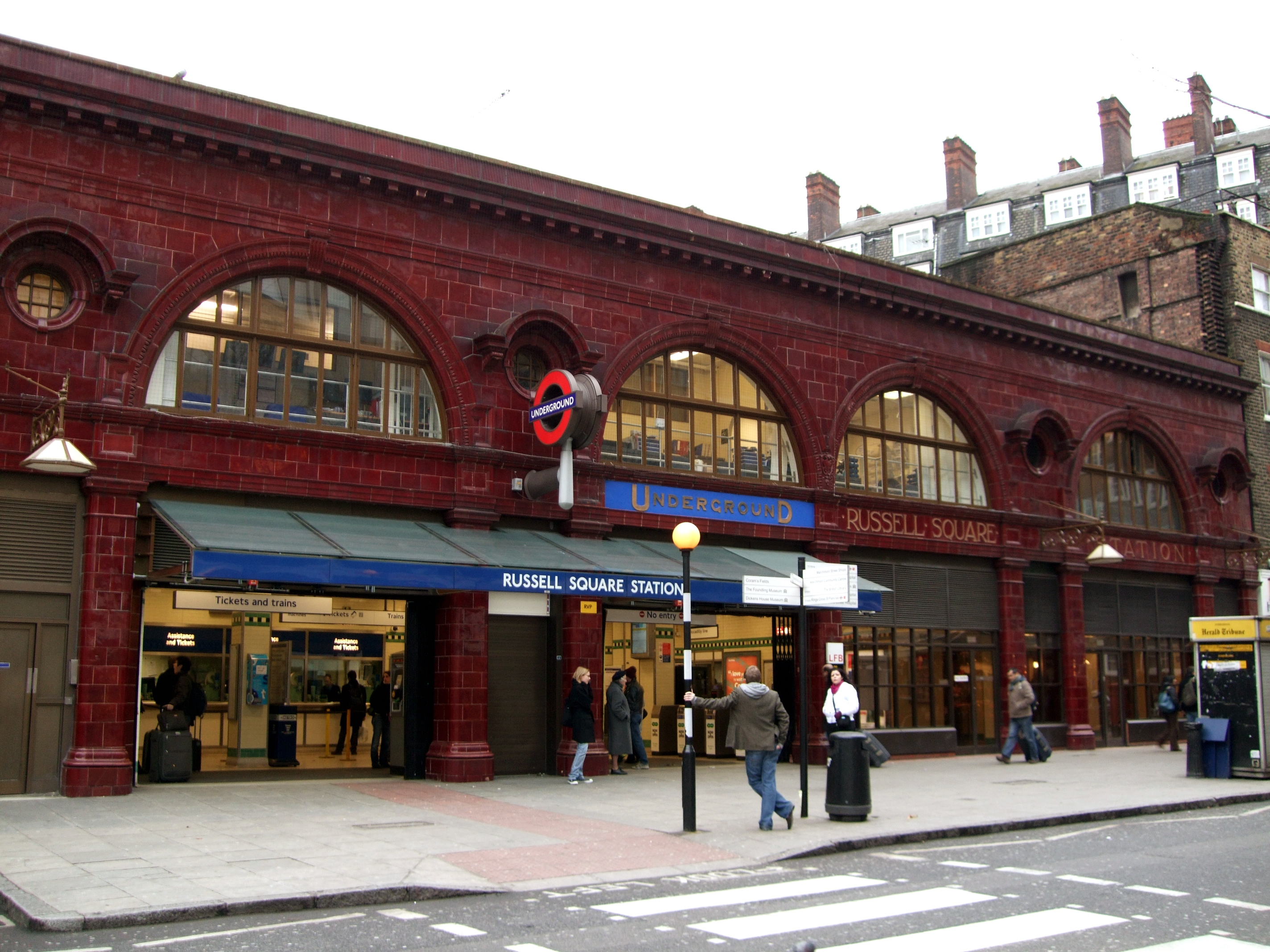
Russell Square station, an example of the Leslie Green design used for the GNP&BR's stations

With the funds available from the UERL, construction began in July 1902 at Knightsbridge, before the formal approval of the merger of the B&PCR and GN&SR. Messrs Walker, Price & Reeves was the main contractor appointed for the line's construction, with the exception of Messrs Walter Scott & Middleton in charge of the portal at Barons Court. Work proceeded quickly, enabling the UERL to record in its annual report in October 1904 that 80 per cent of the tunnels had been completed and that track laying was about to begin. Stations were provided with surface buildings designed by architect Leslie Green in the UERL house-style. This consisted of two-storey steel-framed buildings faced with dark oxblood red glazed terracotta blocks, with wide semi-circular windows on the upper floor. (Note: The existing DR stations at South Kensington and Gloucester Road had extensions added in the UERL style, to accommodate the lifts to the deep level platforms. The DR stations at Earl's Court, Barons Court and Hammersmith were rebuilt to designs by Harry W. Ford. The station at Finsbury Park was constructed by the GNR to its own design without a significant surface building.) Except for Finsbury Park, where the platforms were close enough to the surface to be accessed by stairs, and Gillespie Road where a long ramp was used, each of the stations with platforms in tube tunnels was provided with between two and four lifts and an emergency spiral staircase in a separate shaft. (Note: The lifts, supplied by American manufacturer Otis, were installed in pairs within 23-foot (7.0 m) diameter shafts. The number of lifts depended on the expected passenger demand at the stations, for example, Down Street had two lifts, but Russell Square, Gloucester Road and Caledonian Road originally had four each.)

The existing DR section between West Kensington and Hammersmith was widened in 1905 to accommodate the new tracks for the GNP&BR. Works on the main route were largely complete by the Autumn of 1906, and after a period of test running the railway was ready to open in December 1906. As a result of the electrification and resignalling of the DR's surface and sub-surface tracks in 1905, the capacity of the existing route was sufficiently increased that the construction of deep-level tunnels east of South Kensington was unnecessary, and the powers were allowed to lapse.

== Opening ==
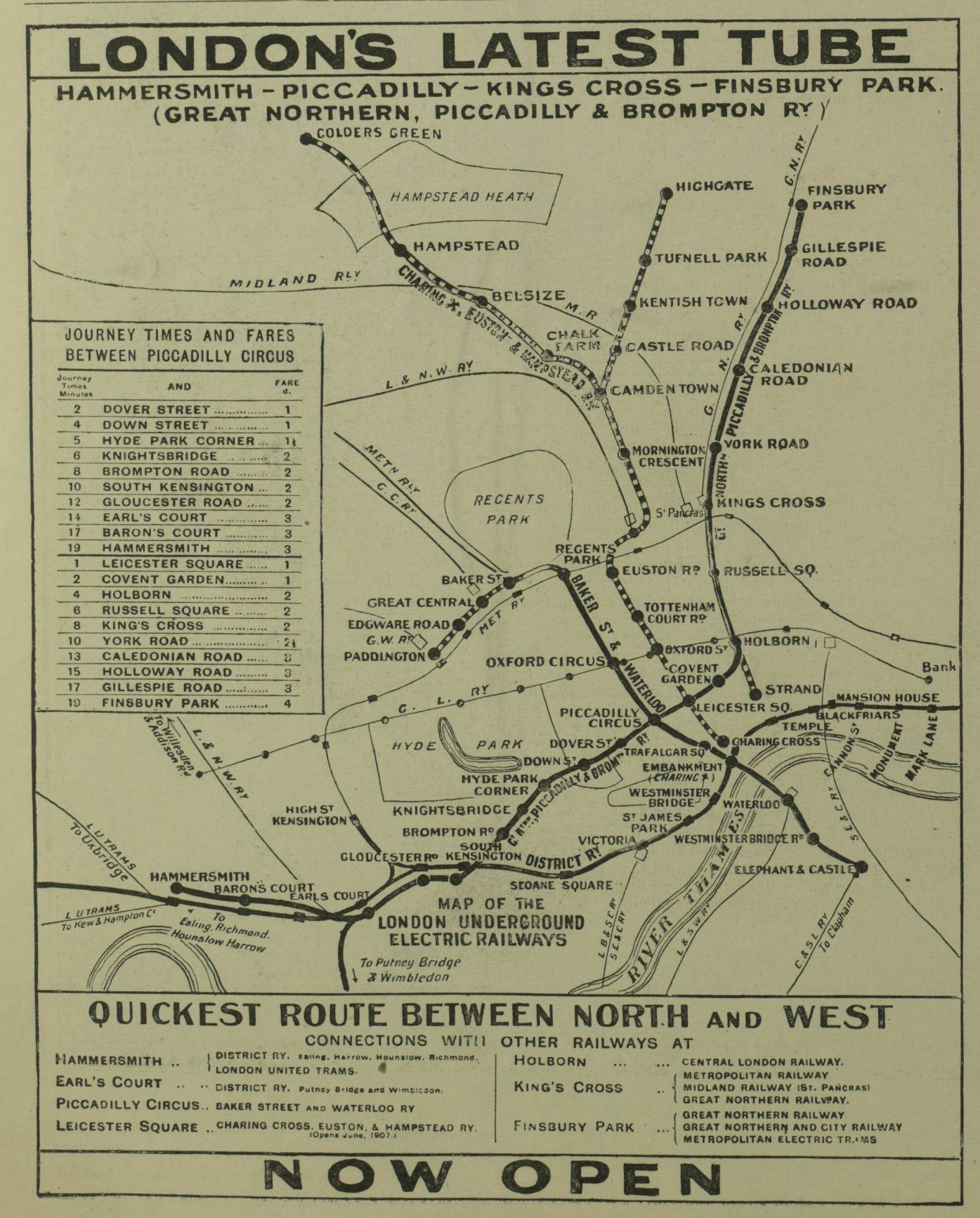
Newspaper advertisement for the opening of the Piccadilly Tube

The official opening of the GNP&BR by David Lloyd George, President of the Board of Trade, took place on 15 December 1906. Progress on the Strand branch was delayed, and it opened in November 1907. From its opening, the GNP&BR was generally known by the abbreviated names Piccadilly Tube or Piccadilly Railway, and the names appeared on the station buildings and on contemporary maps of the tube lines.

The railway had stations at:

- Finsbury Park
- Gillespie Road (now Arsenal)
- Holloway Road
- Caledonian Road
- York Road (closed 17 September 1932)
- King's Cross (now King's Cross St Pancras)
- Russell Square
- Holborn
- Strand (later Aldwych, opened 30 November 1907, closed 30 September 1994)
- Covent Garden (opened 11 April 1907)
- Leicester Square
- Piccadilly Circus
- Dover Street (now Green Park)
- Down Street (opened 15 March 1907, closed 25 May 1932)
- Hyde Park Corner
- Knightsbridge
- Brompton Road (closed 29 July 1934)
- South Kensington (opened 8 January 1907)
- Gloucester Road
- Earl's Court
- Barons Court
- Hammersmith

The service was provided by a fleet of carriages manufactured for the UERL in France and Hungary. These carriages were built to the same design used for the BS&WR and the CCE&HR, and operated as electric multiple unit trains without the need for separate locomotives. Passengers boarded and left the trains through folding lattice gates at each end of cars; these gates were operated by Gate-men who rode on an outside platform and announced station names as trains arrived. The design became known on the Underground as the 1906 stock or Gate stock. Trains for the line were stabled at the Lillie Bridge Depot in West Kensington. (Note: Trains entered and exited the depot via a loop from the eastbound DR line to the east of West Kensington station.)

== Co-operation and consolidation, 1906–1913 ==
Despite the UERL's success in financing and constructing the railway in only seven years, its opening did not bring the financial success that had been expected. In the Piccadilly Tube's first twelve months of operation it carried 26 million passengers, less than half of the 60 million that had been predicted during the planning of the line. The UERL's pre-opening predictions of passenger numbers for its other new lines proved to be similarly over-optimistic, as did the projected figures for the newly electrified DR – in each case, numbers achieved only around fifty per cent of their targets. (Note: The UERL had predicted 35 million passengers for the B&SWR and 50 million for the CCE&HR in their first year of operation, but achieved 20.5 and 25 million respectively. For the DR it had predicted an increase to 100 million passengers after electrification, but achieved 55 million.)

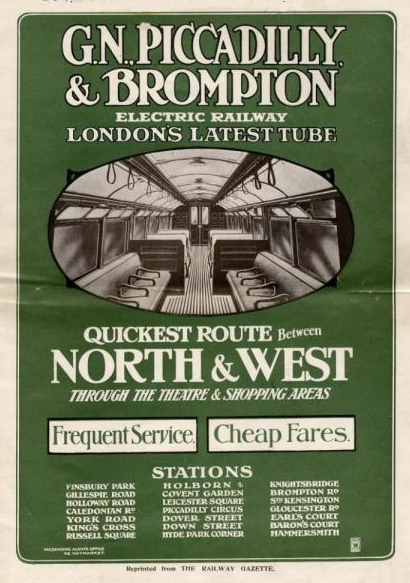
Pamphlet promoting the line from 1906

The lower than expected passenger numbers were partly due to competition between the tube and sub-surface railway companies, but the introduction of electric trams and motor buses, replacing slower, horse-drawn road transport, took a large number of passengers away from the trains. The problem was not limited to the UERL; all of London's seven tube lines and the sub-surface DR and Metropolitan Railway were affected to some degree. The reduced revenues generated from the lower passenger numbers made it difficult for the UERL and the other railways to pay back the capital borrowed, or to pay dividends to shareholders.

From 1907, in an effort to improve their finances, the UERL, the C&SLR, the CLR and the GN&CR began to introduce fare agreements. From 1908, they began to present themselves through common branding as the Underground. The W&CR was the only tube railway that did not participate in the arrangement as it was owned by the mainline L&SWR.

The UERL's three tube railway companies were still legally separate entities, with their own management, shareholder and dividend structures. There was duplicated administration between the three companies and, to streamline the management and reduce expenditure, the UERL announced a bill in November 1909 that would merge the Piccadilly, the Hampstead and the Bakerloo Tubes into a single entity, the London Electric Railway (LER), although the lines retained their own individual branding. (Note: The merger was carried out by transferring the assets of the CCE&HR and the BS&WR to the GNP&BR and renaming the GNP&BR as the London Electric Railway.) The bill received royal assent on 26 July 1910 as the London Electric Railway Amalgamation Act 1910 (10 Edw. 7. & 1 Geo. 5. c. xxxii). This took effect on 1 July that year.

In October 1911, the Piccadilly tube platforms at Earl's Court station became the first on the Underground network to be served by escalators when a link between the District and Piccadilly platforms was created. (Note: The success of the Earl's Court escalators led to all later deep-tube stations being built with escalators rather than lifts. Where possible, escalators were gradually installed to replace lifts in existing stations.)

In November 1912, a bill was publicised under the LER name that included a plan to extend the Piccadilly tube tracks westwards from Hammersmith to connect to the L&SWR's Richmond branch tracks. The District line already ran trains over this route, and the Piccadilly tube service would provide additional connections. The bill received assent as the London Electric Railway Act 1913 (3 & 4 Geo. 5. c. xcvii) on 15 August 1913. The advent of World War I prevented work on the extension starting. Post-war, a shortage of funds and other priorities meant that the extension was postponed until the early 1930s.

== Move to public ownership, 1923–1933 ==
Despite improvements made to other parts of the network, (Note: During World War I, the BS&WR was extended from Paddington to Watford Junction. Post war; the extension of the CLR from Wood Lane to Ealing Broadway (1920) was opened.) the Underground railways continued to struggle financially. The UERL's ownership of the highly profitable London General Omnibus Company (LGOC) since 1912 had enabled the UERL group, through the pooling of revenues, to use profits from the bus company to subsidise the less profitable railways. (Note: By having a virtual monopoly of bus services, the LGOC was able to make large profits and pay dividends far higher than the underground railways ever had. In 1911, the year before its take over by the UERL, the dividend had been 18 per cent.) However, competition from numerous small bus companies during the early 1920s eroded the profitability of the LGOC and had a negative impact on the profitability of the whole UERL group.

In an effort to protect the UERL group's income, its chairman Lord Ashfield lobbied the government for regulation of transport services in the London area. Starting in 1923, a series of legislative initiatives were made in this direction, with Ashfield and Labour London County Councillor (later MP and Minister of Transport) Herbert Morrison, at the forefront of debates as to the level of regulation and public control under which transport services should be brought. Ashfield aimed for regulation that would give the UERL group protection from competition and allow it to take substantive control of the LCC's tram system; Morrison preferred full public ownership. After seven years of false starts, a bill was announced at the end of 1930 for the formation of the London Passenger Transport Board (LPTB), a public corporation that would take control of the UERL, the Metropolitan Railway and all bus and tram operators within an area designated as the London Passenger Transport Area. The Board was a compromise – public ownership but not full nationalisation – and came into existence on 1 July 1933. On this date, the LER and the other Underground companies were liquidated.

== Legacy ==
The original GNP&BR route was extended at both ends in the early 1930s. In the north, a new route was constructed to Wood Green, Southgate and Cockfosters. In the west, the extension from Hammersmith approved in 1913 was finally carried out. The extension paralleled the District line's route to Acton and Hounslow, and took over the District line's route to Uxbridge. In 1977, the Hounslow branch was extended to Heathrow Airport. The Strand branch was closed in 1994. Today, the GNP&BR's tunnels form the core of the Piccadilly line's 73.97-kilometre (45.96 mi) route.

York Road, Down Street and Brompton Road stations were closed in the early 1930s due to low usage, but in the lead-up to World War II the underground passageways at Down Street and Brompton Road were considered useful as protected deep shelters for critical government and military operations. Down Street was fitted out for use by the Railway Executive Committee and the War Cabinet. Brompton Road was used as a control centre for anti-aircraft operations, and after the war was used by the Territorial Army. Between September 1940 and July 1946, the Strand branch was temporarily closed, its tunnels used to store exhibits from the British Museum as well as serving as an air-raid shelter.

== Notes and references ==
=== Bibliography ===
- Badsey-Ellis, Antony (2005). London's Lost Tube Schemes. Capital Transport. ISBN 1-85414-293-3.
- Connor, J.E. (1999). London's Disused Underground Stations. Capital Transport. ISBN 1-85414-250-X.
- Horne, M.A.C. (2007). The Piccadilly Tube — A History of the First Hundred Years. Capital Transport. ISBN 978-1-85414-305-1.
- Day, John R.; Reed, John (2008) [1963]. The Story of London's Underground (10th ed.). Harrow: Capital Transport. ISBN 978-1-85414-316-7.
- Rose, Douglas (1999). The London Underground, A Diagrammatic History. Douglas Rose/Capital Transport. ISBN 1-85414-219-4.
- Wolmar, Christian (2005) [2004]. The Subterranean Railway: How the London Underground Was Built and How It Changed the City Forever. Atlantic Books. ISBN 1-84354-023-1.
