= Piccadilly Circus tube station =

London Underground station

Piccadilly Circus
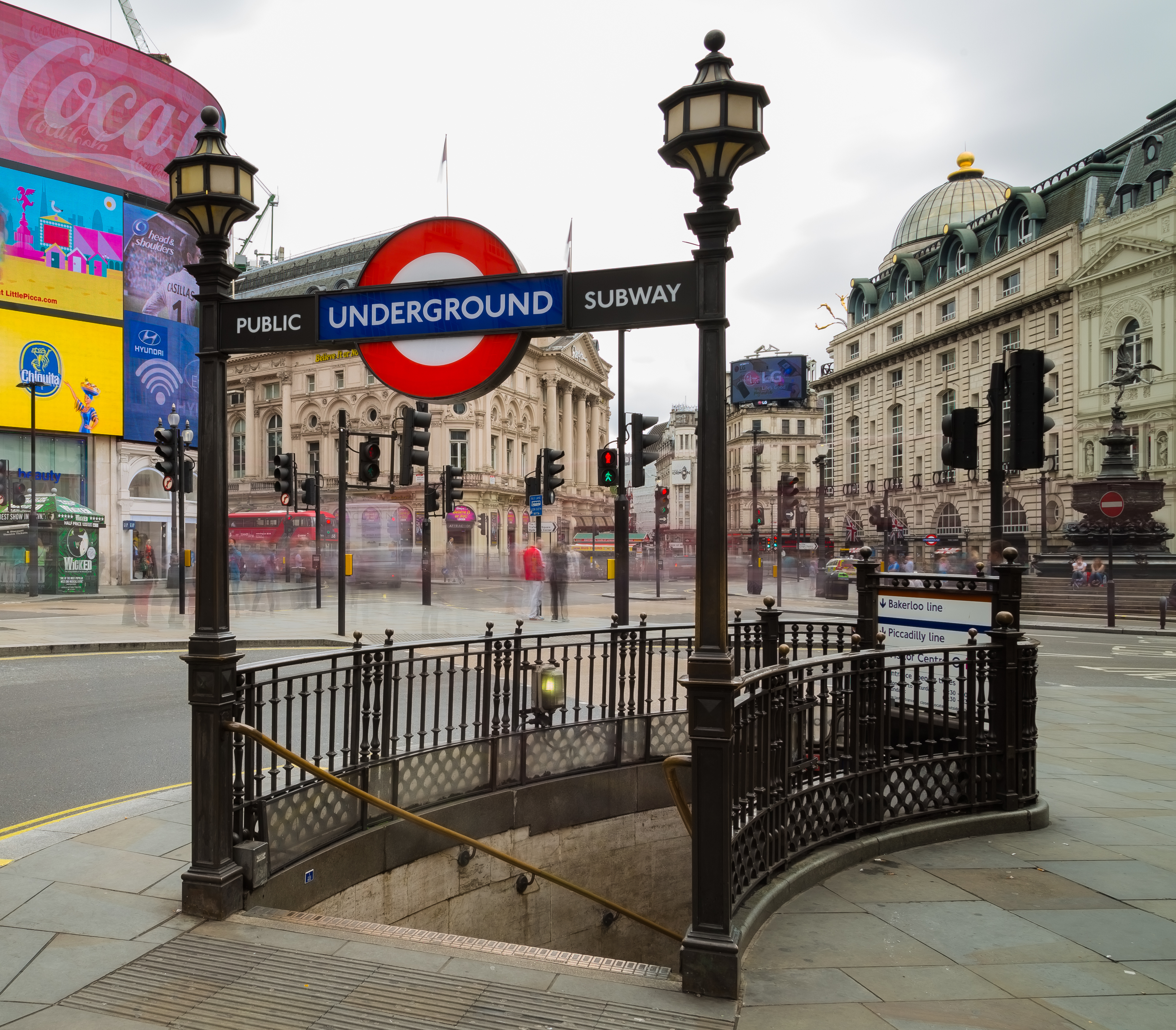
- Station subway entrance in Piccadilly Circus
- Interactive map of Piccadilly Circus

General information
- Location: Piccadilly Circus
- Local authority: City of Westminster
- Managed by: London Underground
- Number of platforms: 4
- Fare zone: 1

London Underground annual entry and exit
- 2020: ▼4.18 million
- 2021: ▲14.14 million
- 2022: ▲27.68 million
- 2023: ▼26.74 million
- 2024: ▲28.49 million

Key dates
- 10 March 1906: Opened

Listed status
- Listing grade: II
- Entry number: 1226877
- Added to list: 7 March 1984; 42 years ago

Other information
- External links: TfL station info page
- Coordinates: 51.5101°N 0.1340°W

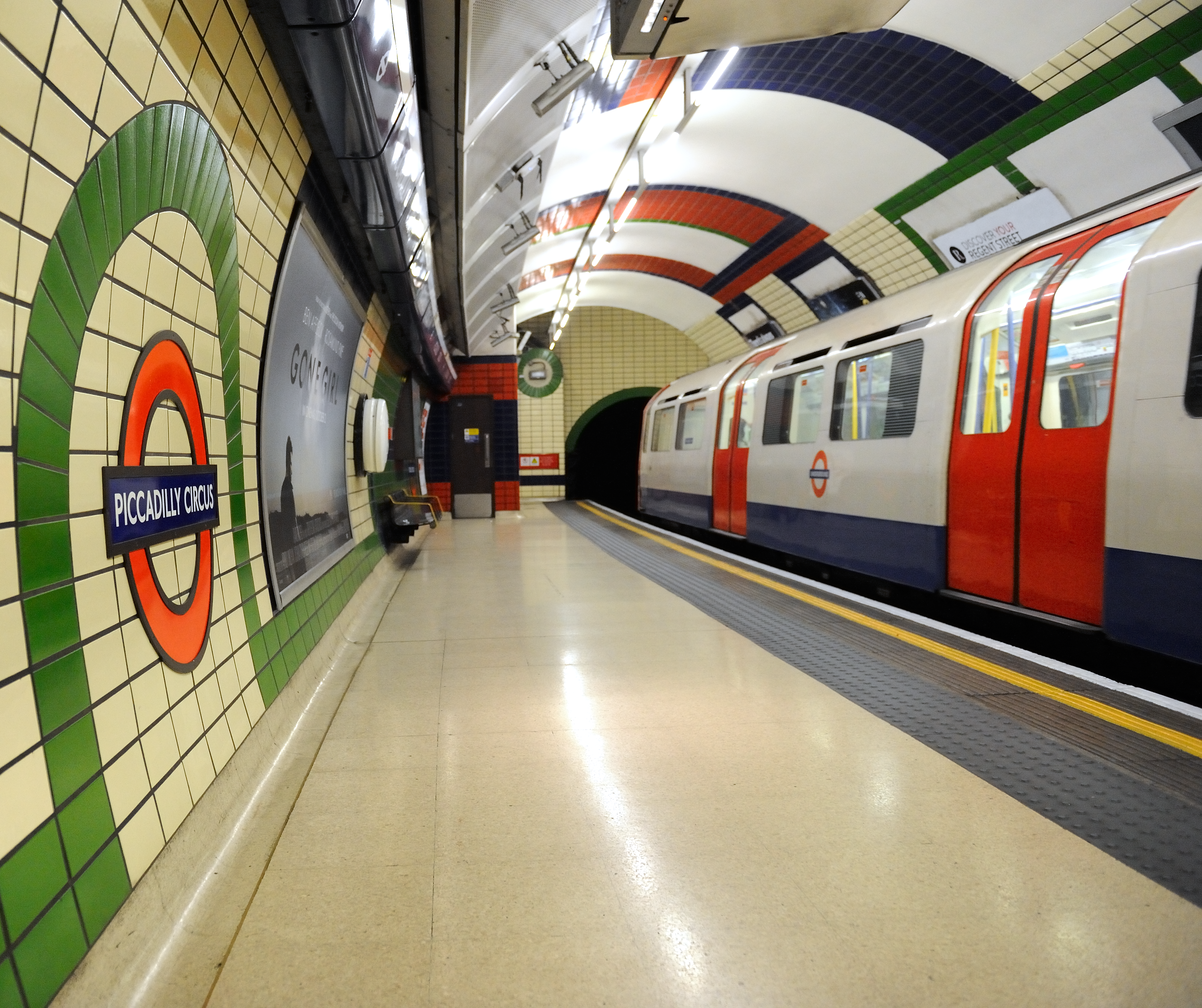
Piccadilly line platform at the station

Piccadilly Circus is a London Underground station in Central London. It is located directly beneath Piccadilly Circus itself, with entrances at every corner. The station is served by the Bakerloo and Piccadilly lines, and is in London fare zone 1. On the Bakerloo line the station is between Oxford Circus and Charing Cross stations, and on the Piccadilly line it is between Green Park and Leicester Square stations.

== History ==
The station was opened on 10 March 1906 by the Baker Street and Waterloo Railway (now the Bakerloo line) with the platforms of the Great Northern, Piccadilly and Brompton Railway (now the Piccadilly line) being opened on 15 December 1906. As originally built it had, like other stations, a surface booking hall (designed, like many in central London built at that time, by Leslie Green). The development of traffic before and after World War I meant that the need for improved station facilities was acute – in 1907 1.5 million passengers used the station, by 1922 it had grown to 18 million passengers.

It was decided to construct a sub-surface booking hall and circulating area, which would also provide public pedestrian subways. Work began in February 1925 and was completed in 1928. The architect was Charles Holden and the builder was John Mowlem & Co: the whole complex cost more than £500,000. A model made by a young Harold Harding and his friend, later wife, Sophie Blair Leighton, of the station he was working on is in the London Transport Museum holdings. Eleven escalators were provided in two flights, leading to the two lines serving the station. Above these escalators was once a mural by artist Stephen Bone, showing the world with London at its centre. This mural was later replaced by advertising. The famous Shaftesbury Memorial Fountain (commonly known as Eros), directly above the station, had to be moved to Victoria Embankment Gardens while the construction work was taking place.

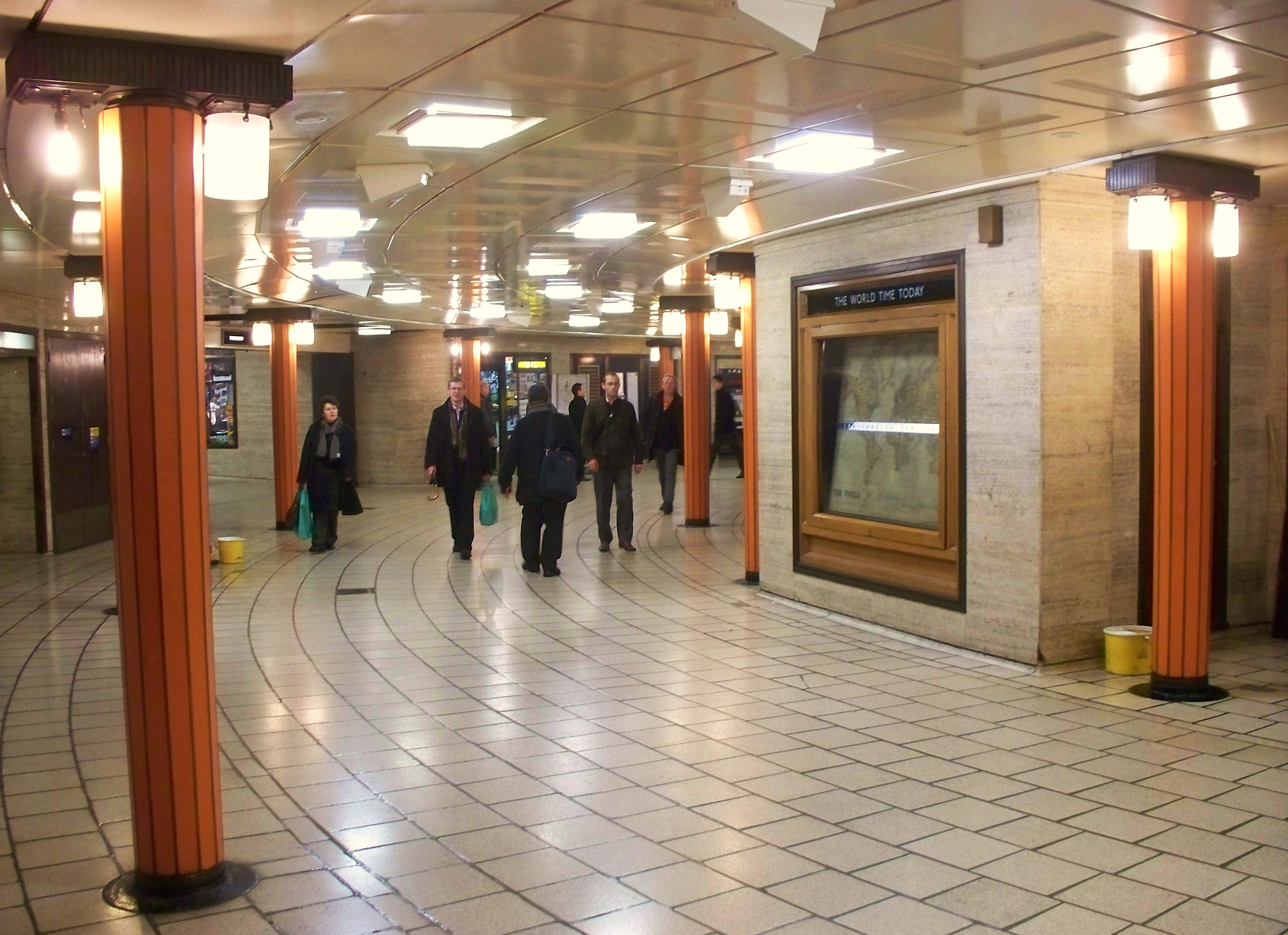
The circular station concourse below the Circus

The old station building designed by Leslie Green finally closed for traffic on 21 July 1929, it was demolished in the 1980s when the large building on the corner of Jermyn Street, Piccadilly and Haymarket was constructed; although parts of it remain preserved in disused areas. The Bakerloo line platforms at Piccadilly Circus offer a unique view on the network: the back to back layout is itself unusual, but the single tunnel containing a crossover at the north end of the station allows passengers to see both platforms at once.

This station can act as an intermediate terminus for southbound Bakerloo line trains. Piccadilly Circus is one of the few stations on the network which have no associated buildings above ground. London Transport Museum frequently runs guided tours of the original Edwardian parts of the station through its "Hidden London" programme.

== Artwork ==
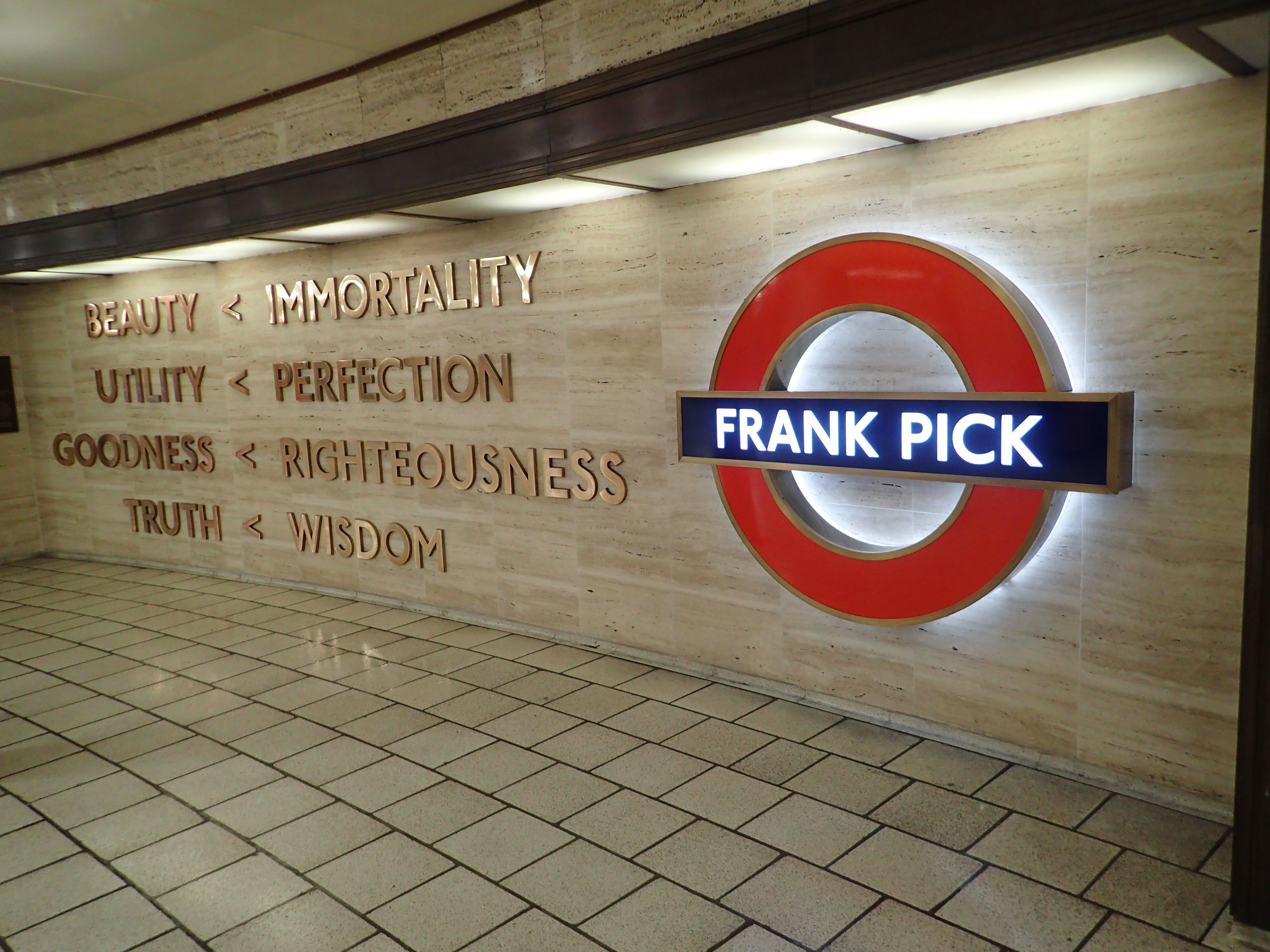
Frank Pick memorial by the artists Langlands & Bell

In 2016, Art on the Underground commissioned artists Langlands & Bell to create an artwork to commemorate Frank Pick, the former CEO of London Transport, on the 75th anniversary of his death. The artwork Beauty < Immortality is located in a prominent place on the wall of the ticket hall, with a Frank Pick tube roundel and bronze lettering in Johnston – a typeface commissioned by Pick in 1915, which is still used across the London transport network today.

== Future ==
Piccadilly Circus is a proposed stop on the Chelsea-Hackney Line, also known as the Crossrail 2. It would be between Victoria and Tottenham Court Road stations. Effectively a new station would have to be built under the existing levels, possibly as part of a major overhaul of the existing buildings. However, there will only be a stop at Piccadilly Circus if the Chelsea-Hackney Line is part of the London Underground network and not part of the National Rail network. This is the same situation with many stations on the proposed route in Central London.

== Connections ==
London Buses day and night routes serve the station.

Preceding station	London Underground	Following station
Oxford Circus towards Harrow & Wealdstone	Bakerloo line	Charing Cross towards Elephant & Castle
Green Park towards Uxbridge, Rayners Lane or Heathrow Airport (Terminal 4 or Terminal 5)	Piccadilly line	Leicester Square towards Cockfosters or Arnos Grove
