= Aldwych tube station =

London Underground station, 1907–1994

Aldwych
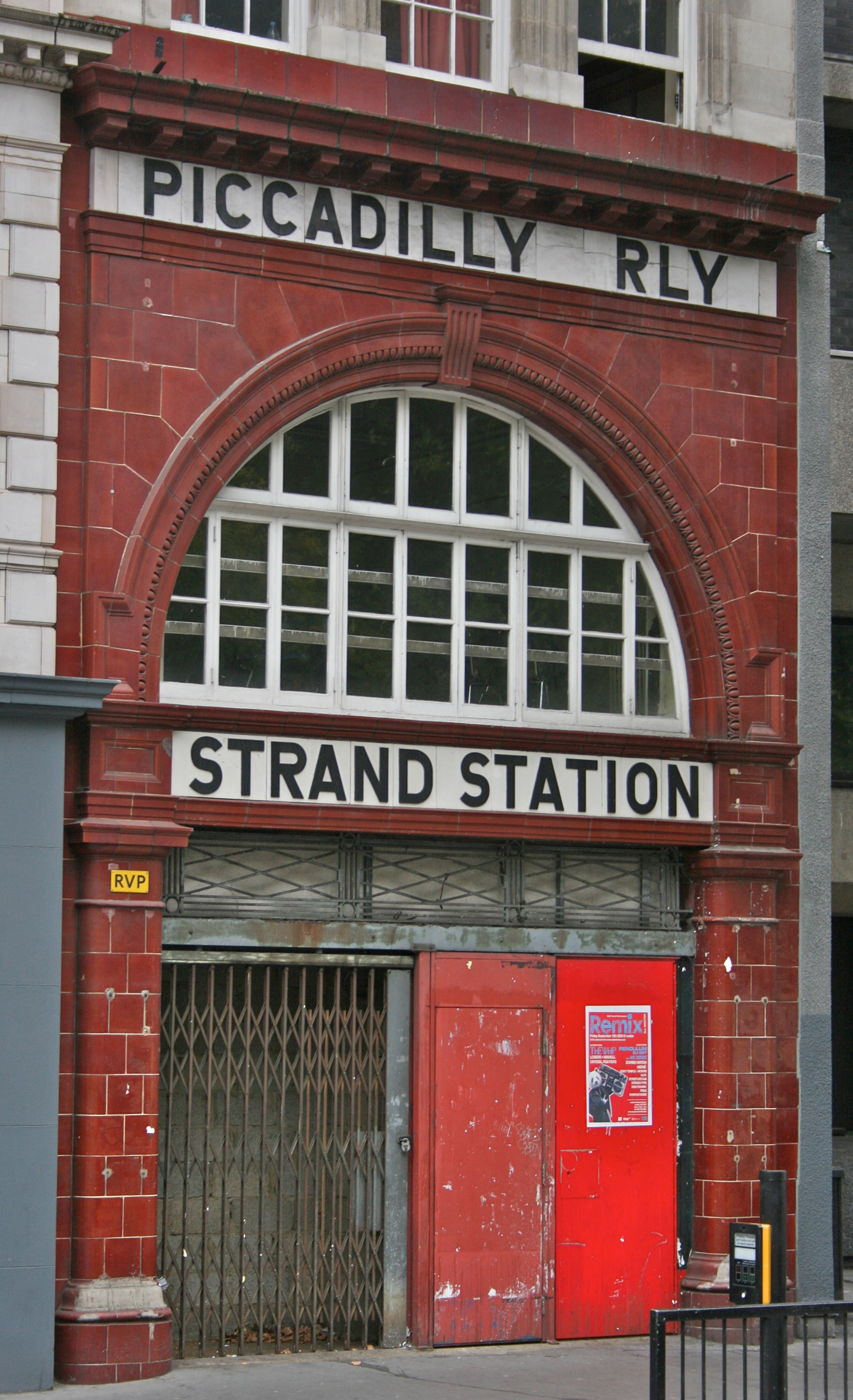
- Main entrance to Aldwych station in 2009 (formerly Strand station)
- Interactive map of Aldwych

General information
- Location: Aldwych
- Local authority: City of Westminster
- Owner: Great Northern, Piccadilly and Brompton Railway
- Number of platforms: 2 (1907–1917); 1 (1917–1994)

Key dates
- 30 November 1907: Opened
- 22 September 1940: Closed
- 1 July 1946: Reopened
- 30 September 1994: Closed

Listed status
- Listing grade: II
- Entry number: 1401034
- Added to list: 20 July 2011

Other information
- Coordinates: 51.51215°N 0.11595°W

Aldwych is a closed station on the London Underground, located in the City of Westminster in Central London. It was opened in 1907 with the name Strand, after the street on which it is located. It was the terminus of the short Piccadilly line branch from Holborn that was a relic of the merger of two railway schemes. The station building is close to the Strand's junction with Surrey Street, near Aldwych. During its lifetime, the branch was the subject of a number of unrealised extension proposals that would have seen the tunnels through the station extended southwards, usually to Waterloo.

Served mostly by a shuttle train and having low passenger numbers, the station and branch were considered for closure several times. Service was offered only during weekday peak hours from 1962 and discontinued in 1994, when the cost of replacing the lifts was considered too high for the income generated.

Disused parts of the station and the running tunnels were used during both world wars to shelter artworks from London's public galleries and museums from bombing. The station is the work of Leslie Green and has long been popular as a filming location, appearing as itself and as other London Underground stations in a number of films. In recognition of its historical significance, the station is a Grade II listed building and is an example of the Modern Style (British Art Nouveau style).

London Transport Museum runs guided tours of the station via its "Hidden London" programme throughout the year. The tour takes visitors through the ticket hall, the original lifts, disused platforms and tunnels; and shares findings from the museum's archives on the history of the site.

== History ==
=== Planning ===
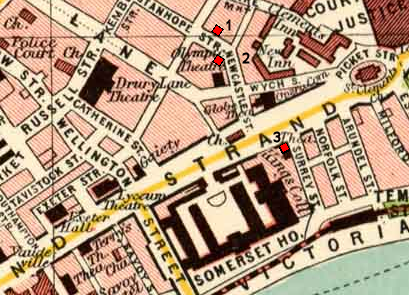
Eastern end of Strand in 1900, before construction of Kingsway and Aldwych. Planned locations of the station are shown in red: 1. Corner of Holles Street (not shown) and Stanhope Street; 2. Future junction of Kingsway and Aldwych; 3. Corner of Strand and Surrey Street

The Great Northern and Strand Railway (GN&SR) first proposed a station in the parish of St Clement Danes in a private bill presented to Parliament in November 1898. The station was to be the southern terminus of an underground railway line planned to run from Wood Green station (now Alexandra Palace) via Finsbury Park and King's Cross and was originally to be located at the corner of Stanhope Street and Holles Street, north of the Strand. When the two streets were scheduled for demolition as part of the London County Council's plans for the construction of Kingsway and Aldwych, the GN&SR moved the location to the junction of the two new roads. Royal assent to the bill was given and the Great Northern and Strand Railway Act 1899 was enacted on 1 August.

In September 1901, the GN&SR was taken over by the Brompton and Piccadilly Circus Railway (B&PCR), which planned to build an underground line from South Kensington to Piccadilly Circus via Knightsbridge. Both were under the control of Charles Yerkes through his Metropolitan District Electric Traction Company and, in June 1902, were transferred to Yerkes' new holding company, the Underground Electric Railways Company of London (UERL). Neither of the railways had carried out any construction, but the UERL obtained permission for new tunnels between Piccadilly Circus and Holborn to connect the two routes. The companies were formally merged as the Great Northern, Piccadilly and Brompton Railway (GNP&BR) following approval in the Great Northern and Strand Railway Act 1902 (2 Edw. 7. c. ccxxxv) November 1902. Prior to confirmation of the merger, the GN&SR had sought permission to extend its line southwards from the future junction of Kingsway and Aldwych, under Norfolk Street to a new interchange under the Metropolitan District Railway's station at Temple. The extension was rejected following objections from the Duke of Norfolk under whose land the last part of the proposed tunnels would have run.

In 1903, the GNP&BR sought permission for a branch from Piccadilly Circus to run under Leicester Square, Strand, and Fleet Street and into the City of London. The branch would have passed and interchanged with the already approved Strand station, allowing travel on the GNP&BR from Strand in three directions. The deliberations of the Royal Commission on London Traffic prevented parliamentary consideration of the proposal, which was withdrawn.

In 1905, with the royal commission's report about to be published, the GNP&BR returned to Parliament with two bills for consideration. The first bill revived the 1903 proposal for a branch from Piccadilly Circus to the City of London, passing and interchanging with Strand station. The second proposed an extension and relocation of Strand station to the junction of Strand and Surrey Street. From there the line was to continue as a single tunnel under the River Thames to Waterloo. The first bill was again delayed and withdrawn. Of the second, it became the Great Northern, Piccadilly and Brompton Railway (Various Powers) Act 1905 (5 Edw. 7. c. clxiii), but only the relocation of Strand station was permitted.

=== Construction ===
Layout of station at platform level, including parts of the station that were never used.

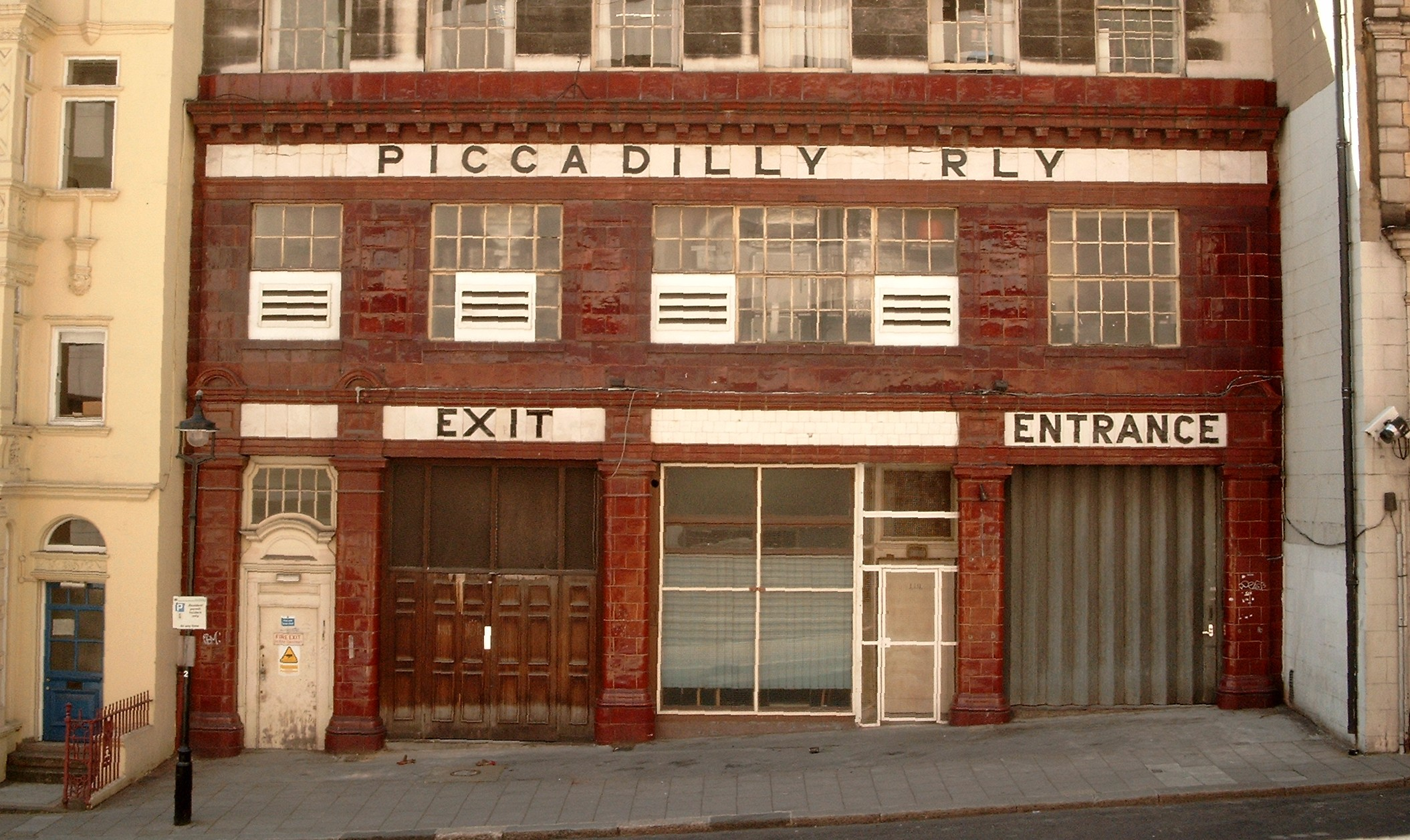
Exit and second entrance on Surrey Street, 2004.

The linking of the GN&SR and B&PCR routes meant that the section of the GN&SR south of Holborn became a branch from the main route. The UERL began constructing the main route in July 1902. Progress was rapid, so that it was largely complete by the Autumn of 1906. Construction of the Holborn to Strand section was delayed while the London County Council constructed Kingsway and the tramway subway running beneath it and while the UERL decided how the junction between the main route and the branch would be arranged at Holborn. (Note: When originally planned, Holborn station was to have just two platforms, shared by trains on the main route and by the shuttle service from Aldwych. The junctions between the routes would have been south of the station. The interference that shuttle trains would have caused to the main route led to a redesign so that two northbound platforms were provided, one for the main line and one for the branch line, with a single southbound platform. The junctions between the two northbound tunnels would have been north of the platforms. When powers were sought to build the junction in 1905, the layout was changed again so that four platforms were to be provided. The southbound tunnel of the main route no longer connected to the branch, which was provided with an additional platform in a dead-end tunnel accessed from a cross tunnel from the northbound branch tunnel. As built, the dead-end platform tunnel was adjacent to the northbound main line platform, for ease of access.)

Strand station was built on the site of the Royal Strand Theatre, which had closed on 13 May 1905 and been demolished. Construction of the station began on 21 October 1905, to a design by the UERL's architect Leslie Green in the UERL house style of a two-storey steel-framed building faced with red glazed terracotta blocks, with wide semi-circular windows on the upper floor. The station building is L-shaped, with two façades separated by the building on the corner of Strand and Surrey Street. The Strand façade is narrow with a single semi-circular window above the entrance. The façade in Surrey Street is wider with a separate entrance and exit and a shop unit. In anticipation of a revival of the extension to Waterloo and the City route, the station was built with three circular lift shafts able to accommodate six trapezium-shaped lifts. Only one of the shafts was fitted out, with two lifts. The other two shafts rose from the lower concourse to the basement of the station, but could have been extended upwards into the space of the shop unit when required. A fourth smaller-diameter shaft accommodated an emergency spiral stair.

The platforms are 92 feet 6 inches (28.2 m) below street level and are 250 feet (76 m) long; shorter than the GNP&BR's standard length of 350 feet (110 m). As with other UERL stations, the platform walls were tiled with distinctive patterns, in this case cream and dark green. Only parts of the platform walls were decorated because it was planned to operate the branch with short trains. Owing to the reduced lift provision, a second route between the platforms and lifts was never brought into use and was left in an unfinished condition without tiling.

=== Operation ===
The layout of the Aldwych branch (not to scale).

The GNP&BR's main route opened on 15 December 1906, but the Strand branch was not opened until 30 November 1907. Initially, shuttle trains operated to Holborn from the eastern platform into the through platform at Holborn. At peak times, an additional train operated alternately in the branch's western tunnel into the bay platform at Holborn. During the first year of operation, a train for theatregoers operated late on Monday to Saturday evenings from Strand through Holborn and northbound to Finsbury Park; this was discontinued in October 1908.

In March 1908, the off-peak shuttle service began to use the western platform at Strand and the through platform at Holborn, crossing between the two branch tunnels south of Holborn. Low usage led to the withdrawal of the second peak-hour shuttle and the eastern tunnel was taken out of use in 1914. On 9 May 1915, three of the Underground stations in the area were renamed and Strand station became Aldwych. (Note: The Strand name was transferred to Charing Cross (Strand) station, now the Northern line platforms of Charing Cross. The other station renamed was Charing Cross (Embankment), which became Charing Cross, and in 1979, Embankment.) Sunday services ended in April 1917 and, in August of the same year, the eastern tunnel and platform at Aldwych and the bay platform at Holborn were formally closed. A German bombing campaign in September 1917 led to the disused platform being used as storage for around 300 paintings from the National Gallery from then until December 1918.

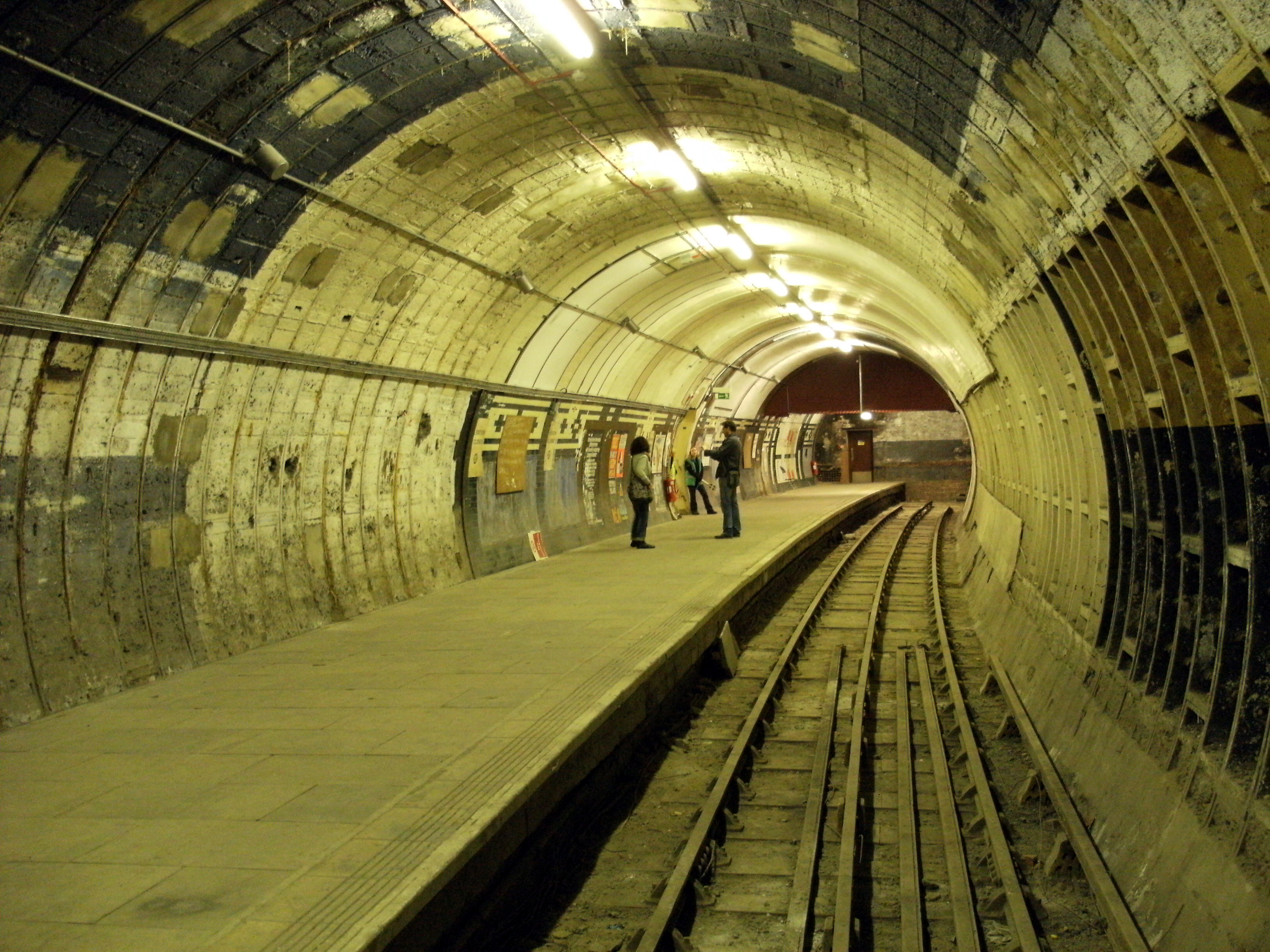
Eastern platform, taken out of use in 1914, showing the exposed structure of the tunnel, 2011.

In October 1922, the ticket office was replaced by a facility in the lifts. Passenger numbers remained low: when the station was one of a number on the network considered for closure in 1929, its annual usage was 1,069,650 and takings were £4,500. (Note: The other stations considered for closure were Down Street (closed 1932), York Road (closed 1932), Brompton Road (closed 1934), Regent's Park, Mornington Crescent, Hyde Park Corner, Gillespie Road (now Arsenal), Gloucester Road and Covent Garden.) The branch was again considered for closure in 1933, but remained open.

Wartime efficiency measures led to the branch being closed temporarily on 22 September 1940, shortly after the start of The Blitz, and it was partly fitted out by the City of Westminster as an air-raid shelter. The tunnels between Aldwych and Holborn were used to store items from the British Museum, including the Elgin Marbles. The branch reopened on 1 July 1946, but patronage did not increase. In 1958, the station was one of three that London Transport announced would be closed. Again it survived, but the service was reduced in June 1958 to run during Monday to Friday peak hours and Saturday morning and early afternoons. (Note: Mornington Crescent and South Acton were the other stations that were to be closed. Only the latter did, on 28 February 1959.) The Saturday service was withdrawn in June 1962.

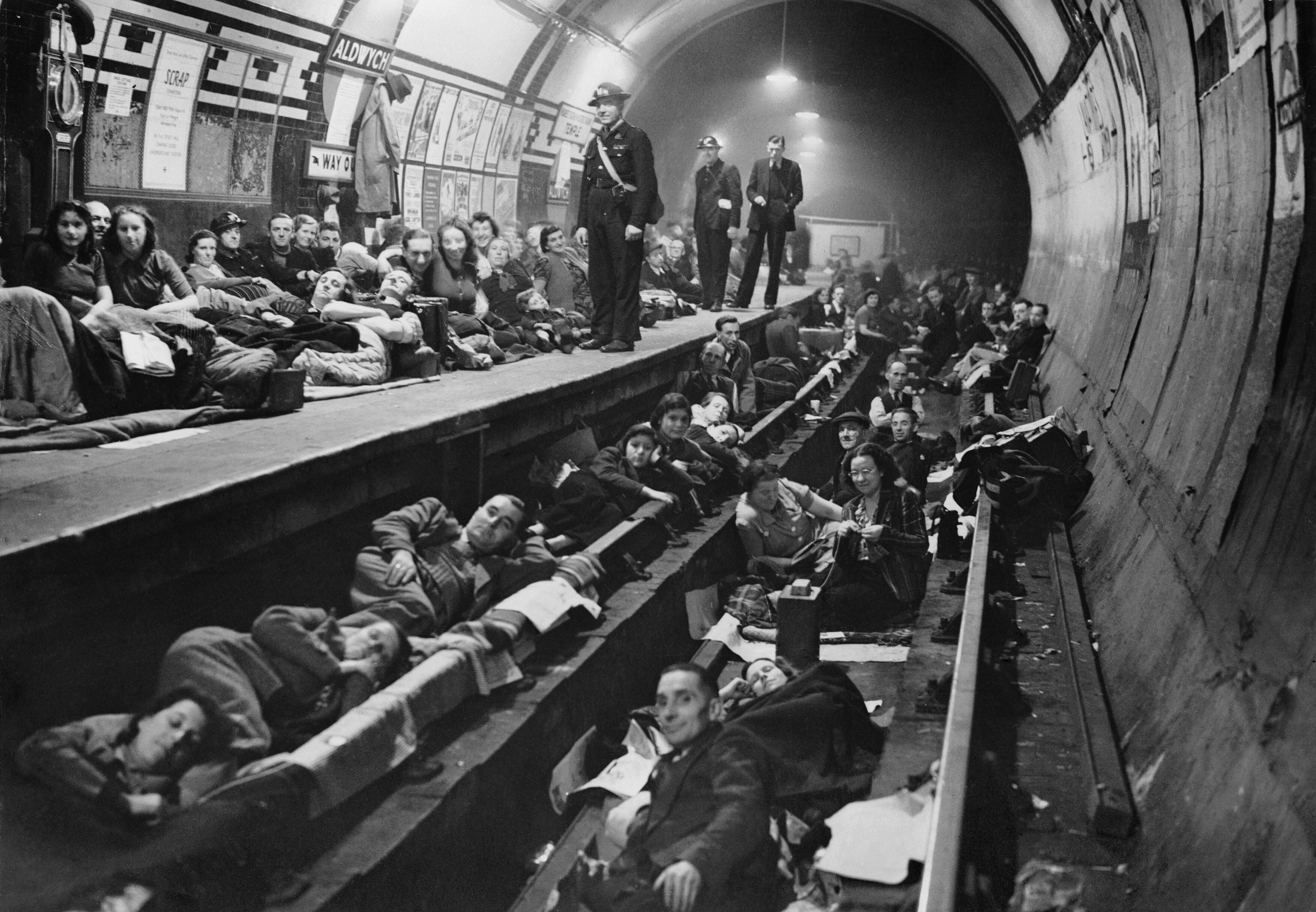
Shelterers inside Aldwych station during the Blitz, 1940.

After operating only during peak hours for more than 30 years, the closure announcement came on 4 January 1993. The original 1907 lifts required replacement at a cost of £3 million. This was not considered justifiable in relation to the passenger numbers using the station and it was losing London Regional Transport £150,000 per year. The Secretary of State for Transport granted permission on 1 September 1994 to close the station, and the branch closed on 30 September. (Note: The Epping to Ongar section of the Central line also closed on 30 September.) Recognising the station's historical significance as a mostly unaltered station from the early 20th century, the station was given Grade II listed building status in 2011. Office floors above the station are used by the Classics department of King's College London, and part of the station is used by the university's Rifle and Pistol Club.

=== Proposals for extension and new connections ===
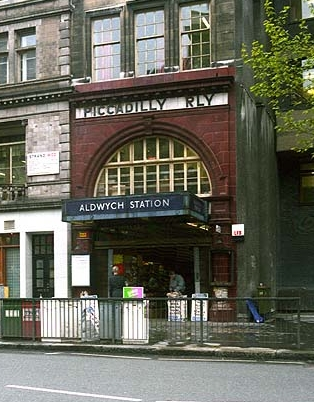
The station entrance before closure in 1994, with a canopy bearing the name it had from 1915.

Although the Piccadilly Circus to City of London branch proposal of 1905 was never revisited after its withdrawal, the early plan to extend the branch south to Waterloo was revived a number of times during the station's life. The extension was considered in 1919 and 1948, but no progress towards constructing the link was made.

In the years after the Second World War, a series of preliminary plans for relieving congestion on the London Underground had considered various east–west routes through the Aldwych area, although other priorities meant that these were never proceeded with. In March 1965, a British Rail and London Transport joint planning committee published "A Railway Plan for London", which proposed a new tube railway, the Fleet line (later renamed the Jubilee line), to join the Bakerloo line at Baker Street then run via Bond Street, Green Park, Charing Cross, Aldwych and into the City of London via Ludgate Circus, Cannon Street and Fenchurch Street before heading into south-east London. An interchange was proposed at Aldwych and a second recommendation of the report was the revival of the link from Aldwych to Waterloo. London Transport had already sought legal powers from Parliament to construct tunnels from Aldwych to Waterloo in November 1964, and these were granted in the London Transport Act 1965 (c. xli) in August 1965. Detailed planning took place, although public spending cuts led to postponement of the scheme in 1967 before tenders were invited.

Planning of the Fleet line continued and approval was given in the London Transport Act 1969 (c. l) in July 1969 for the first phase of the line, from Baker Street to Charing Cross. Tunnelling began on the £35 million route in February 1972 and the Jubilee line opened north from Charing Cross in May 1979. The tunnels of the approved section continued east of Charing Cross under Strand almost as far as Aldwych station, but no work at Aldwych was undertaken and they were used only as sidings. Funding for the second phase of the work was delayed throughout the 1970s whilst the route beyond Charing Cross was reviewed to consider options for serving anticipated development in the London Docklands area. By 1979, the cost was estimated as £325 million, a six-fold increase from the £51 million estimated in 1970. A further review of alternatives for the Jubilee line was carried out in 1980, which led to a change of priorities and the postponement of any further effort on the line. When the extension was eventually constructed in the late 1990s it took a different route, south of the River Thames via Westminster, Waterloo and London Bridge to provide a rapid link to Canary Wharf, leaving the tunnels between Green Park and Aldwych redundant.

Following the station's closure, in 1996 the Civic Trust and other organisations including Transport 2000 proposed to create a heritage railway. The station would be restored to an inter-war appearance, and old Underground rolling stock would be used for journeys on the disused tracks. London Underground rejected the proposal on safety and cost grounds.

In July 2005, Ove Arup & Partners produced a report, DLR Horizon 2020 Study, for the Docklands Light Railway (DLR) examining schemes to expand and improve the DLR network between 2012 and 2020. One of the proposals was an extension of the DLR from Bank to Charing Cross via City Thameslink and Aldwych. The disused Jubilee line tunnels would be enlarged to accommodate the larger DLR trains and Aldwych station would form the basis for a new station on the line, although requiring considerable reconstruction to accommodate escalators. The estimated cost in 2005 was £232 million for the infrastructure works and the scheme was described as "strongly beneficial" as it was expected to attract passengers from the London Underground's existing east–west routes and from local buses and reduce overcrowding at Bank station. The business case assessment was that the proposal offered high value, although similar values were calculated for other extension proposals from Bank. Further detailed studies were proposed.

In 2015, a scheme was proposed by the design firm Gensler to convert disused London Underground tunnels into subterranean rail trails, enabling the disused branches of the Piccadilly line and Jubilee line to be used as cycle paths. The scheme, which would involve re-opening Aldwych station as an access point for cyclists, has not been officially approved.

== Use in media ==
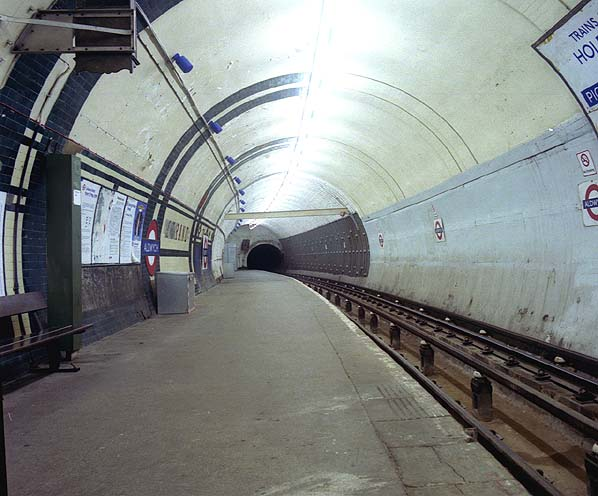
Western platform shortly before closure. The undecorated section of wall is visible at the far end of the tunnel, 1994.

Because it was a self-contained section of the London Underground that was closed outside weekday peak hours, Aldwych station and the branch line from Holborn were popular locations for filming scenes set on the Tube even before their closure. Since the branch's closure in 1994, its use in film productions has continued, with the station appearing as itself and, with appropriate signage, as other stations on the network. The track and infrastructure are maintained in operational condition, and until 2021 a train of ex-Northern line 1972 tube stock was stabled on the branch. This train could be driven up and down the branch for filming. The physical connection with the Piccadilly line northbound tracks remains, but requires manual operation.

Films and television productions that have been shot at Aldwych include:

- The Gentle Gunman (1952)
- Gideon’s Day (1958)
- Battle of Britain (1969)
- Deep End (1970)
- Death Line (1972)
- Take It or Leave It (1981)
- Superman IV: The Quest for Peace (1987)
- The Krays (1990)
- Patriot Games (1992)
- Creep (2004)
- V for Vendetta (2005)
- The Good Shepherd (2006)
- Atonement (2007)
- 28 Weeks Later (2007)
- Primeval (2007)
- The Bank Job (2008)
- The Edge of Love (2008)
- Mr Selfridge (2013)
- Fast & Furious 6 (2013)
- Sherlock (2014)
- Darkest Hour (2017)
- Secrets of the London Underground (2021)
- Luther: The Fallen Sun (2023)

The pre-war operation of the station features in a pivotal scene in Geoffrey Household's novel Rogue Male, when the pursuit of the protagonist by an enemy agent sees them repeatedly using the shuttle service on the branch line. A chase through Aldwych station ends with the agent's death by electrocution on the track. The station is the setting for the climax of the Doctor Who novel The Pescatons. A much modified and expanded version of the station appears as a level in the video game Tomb Raider III. The music video for The Prodigy's song "Firestarter" was filmed in the disused eastern tunnel and one of the unused lift shafts. The station was the subject of an episode of Most Haunted in 2002. The station was also the subject of an episode of The Magnus Archives in 2018.

== See also ==
- List of former and unopened London Underground stations

== Notes and references ==
=== Bibliography ===
- Badsey-Ellis, Antony (2005). London's Lost Tube Schemes. Capital Transport. ISBN 1-85414-293-3.
- Badsey-Ellis, Antony; Horne, Mike (2009). The Aldwych Branch. Capital Transport. ISBN 978-1-85414-321-1.
- Connor, J.E. (2001) [1999]. London's Disused Underground Stations. Capital Transport. ISBN 1-85414-250-X.
- Horne, Mike (2000). The Jubilee Line. Capital Transport. ISBN 1-85414-220-8.
- Household, Geoffrey (1977) [1939]. Rogue Male. Penguin Books. ISBN 0-14-000695-8.
- Rose, Douglas (1999). The London Underground, A Diagrammatic History. Douglas Rose/Capital Transport. ISBN 1-85414-219-4.
- Wolmar, Christian (2005) [2004]. The Subterranean Railway: How the London Underground Was Built and How It Changed the City Forever. Atlantic Books. ISBN 1-84354-023-1.

Former
| Preceding station | London Underground | Following station |
|---|---|---|
| Holborn Terminus | Piccadilly line Aldwych branch (1907–1994) | Terminus |
Abandoned plans
| Preceding station | London Underground | Following station |
| Charing Cross towards Stanmore | Jubilee line Phase 2 (never constructed) | Ludgate Circus towards New Cross Gate or Lewisham |
| Holborn Terminus | Piccadilly line Proposed extension to Waterloo (never constructed) | Waterloo Terminus |
