= York Road =

York Road may refer to:

== Roads ==
=== Asia ===
- York Road, Hong Kong in Kowloon Tong

=== Australia ===
- York Road, Western Australia, an early name for portions of the Great Eastern Highway

=== Europe ===
- York Way, Islington, London, formerly named York Road (until 1938)
- York Road, Lambeth, London

=== North America ===
United States

- York Road (Baltimore), a major road heading north from Baltimore, Maryland
- Old York Road, formerly York Road, connecting Philadelphia with New York City via New Jersey

Canada

- Niagara Regional Road 81, known as York Road in Queenston, Ontario
- York Boulevard in Hamilton, Ontario
- Ontario Highway 2 historically had been known as York Road for portions of the Kingston-Toronto route
- Royal York Road (and associated tube station) in Etobicoke, Toronto, Ontario

== Transit ==
- York Road (rail), a railway depot in Belfast, Northern Ireland; originally one of the city's main stations, it has been replaced by Yorkgate Station
- York Road tube station, a disused station on the London Underground
- King's Cross York Road, a former railway station located close to the Underground station

== Structures ==
- York Road (Maidenhead), a football (soccer) stadium in Maidenhead, England, home of Maidenhead United F.C.
