= Caledonian =

Caledonian is a geographical term used to refer to places, species, or items in or from Scotland, or particularly the Scottish Highlands. It derives from Caledonia, the Roman name for the area of modern Scotland.

Caledonian is also used to refer to places or people in or from New Caledonia.

Caledonian may also refer to:

== Transport ==
- Caledonian (ship), several ships with the name
- Caledonian (locomotive), an early locomotive of the Liverpool and Manchester Railway
- The Caledonian, discontinued British passenger train
- Caledonian Airways, former Scottish airline
- Caledonian Canal, between Inverness and Fort William, Scotland
- Caledonian Railway, former Scottish railway company
- Caledonian Railway (Brechin), preserved steam railway
- Caledonian Road (disambiguation), the name of several places in London, England
- Caledonian Sleeper, a sleeper train service in Scotland

== Sports ==
- Caledonian F.C., former football club from Inverness
- Caledonian F.C. (Glasgow), former football club from Glasgow
- Caledonian F.C. (Aberdeen), former football club from Aberdeen
- Inverness Caledonian Thistle F.C., football club created in 1994 by the merger of Caledonian F.C. and Inverness Thistle F.C.
  - Caledonian Stadium, football stadium in Inverness opened in 1996, home ground of the above
- Caledonian Ground, sports venue in Dunedin, New Zealand

== Other uses ==
- Caledonians, an ancient tribal confederation
- Caledonian orogeny, a geological event
- Caledonian Brewery, in Edinburgh, Scotland
- Caledonian Forest, the native woodland of Highland Scotland
- Caledonian Hall, a historic building in Holyoke, Massachusetts
- Caledonian-Record, a newspaper published in Vermont, USA
- Caledonian (ward), electoral district in Islington, London, England
- Glasgow Caledonian University, in Glasgow, Scotland
- Royal Caledonian Horticultural Society, also known as the Caley

It is also used by Scottish institutions or societies around the world, or by groups with Scottish ancestry. For example, the Caledonian Club in London.

== See also ==
- Caledonia
- Caledonians
- Caledonians (disambiguation)
