= Bingfield Park =

Park in the London Borough of Islington, England

Coordinates: 51°32′23″N 0°7′16″W

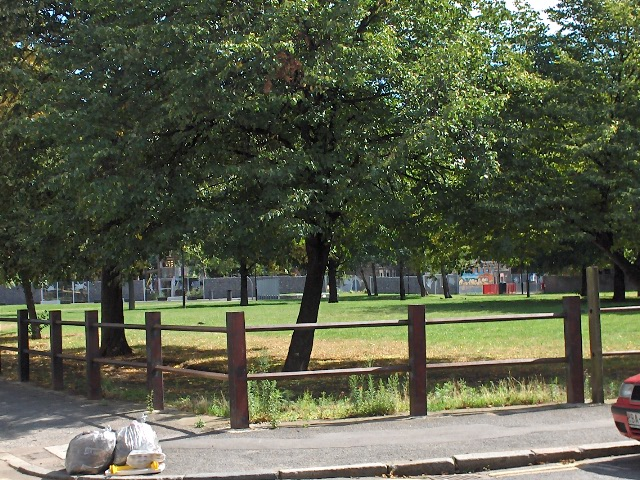
Bingfield Park

Bingfield Park is a small park area located in the Caledonian Ward and parish of St. Michaels area of the London Borough of Islington. The Park has existed since about 1970 when the Beaconsfield Buildings (built by the Victoria Dwellings Association — Patron Benjamin Disraeli, British prime minister, the Earl of Beaconsfield.) were purchased by the Greater London Council and demolished. These Buildings were preceded by small holdings and cottages and known as Strouds Vale and bordered on to the areas known as Sutton Gardens, Belle Isle and Copenhagen fields.

Also demolished was The Clarance Terrace, a red bricked six storey high terrace of apartments fronting on to Rufford Street (formerly Almina Road).

At the western and northern perimeters, the Park joins Rufford Street; at the south perimeter it meets Bingfield Street. It is close to the disused York Road Underground station and York Way. The Park has an all-weather sports pitch and an adventure playground for children at its eastern end.

The Park is a popular recreational area for people living in the locality.
