= Caledonian Road =

Caledonian Road could refer to:

- Caledonian Road, London, a road in North London
- Caledonian Road tube station, a tube station in North London
- Caledonian Road and Barnsbury station, a nearby railway station in North London
- Holloway and Caledonian Road railway station a former station on the main line out of King's Cross.
