= Caledonians (disambiguation) =

Caledonians is the English language translation of the Latin word Caledonii, referring to the enemies of the Roman Empire in Caledonia (modern Scotland).

Caledonians may also refer to:

- Caledonians, often in a light-hearted context, used as an alternative word to Scots, Scottish or Scotch, to refer to people who live in, or come from, Scotland.
- Caledonians, a square dance for eight resembling the quadrille.
- Residents of New Caledonia.
- Russians in the United Kingdom

== See also ==
- Caledonian (disambiguation)
- Caledonia
