= Leslie Green =

English architect

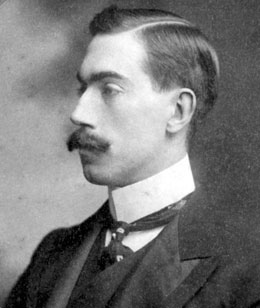
- Leslie Green, c. 1906
- Born: Leslie William Green; 6 February 1875; Maida Vale, London
- Died: 31 August 1908 (aged 33)
- Education: Dover College, South Kensington School of Art
- Occupation: Architect
- Known for: London Underground stations
- Spouse: Mildred Ethel Wildy (m.1902)
- Children: Vera (daughter)
- Awards: Fellow of the RIBA

Leslie William Green (6 February 1875 – 31 August 1908) was an English architect. He is best known for his design of iconic stations constructed on the London Underground railway system in central London during the first decade of the 20th century, with distinctive oxblood red faïence blocks including pillars and semi-circular first-floor windows, and patterned tiled interiors done in the Modern Style.

== Early and private life ==
Green was born in Maida Vale, London in 1875, the second of four children of architect and Crown Surveyor Arthur Green and his wife Emily Robertson. He spent periods studying at Dover College and South Kensington School of Art, and in Paris, between periods working as an assistant in his father's architectural practice.

Green married Mildred Ethel Wildy (1879–1960) in Clapham in April 1902. In 1904, they had a daughter, Vera (1904–1995).

== Career ==
Green established his own practice as an architect in 1897, working initially from his father's offices, before moving to Haymarket in 1900 and then to Adelphi House on Adam Street, by the Strand, in 1903. He became an associate of the Royal Institute of British Architects (RIBA) in 1898, and a member in 1899. Early commissions included works to homes and shops in various parts of the capital city.

In 1903 he was appointed as architect for the Underground Electric Railways Company of London (UERL) to design stations for three underground railway lines then under construction – the Great Northern, Piccadilly and Brompton Railway (GNP&BR), the Baker Street and Waterloo Railway (BS&WR) and the Charing Cross, Euston and Hampstead Railway (CCE&HR), which, respectively, became parts of the present day Piccadilly line, Bakerloo line and Northern line. Green was commissioned to design 50 new stations, including their external appearance, and internal fittings and decoration.

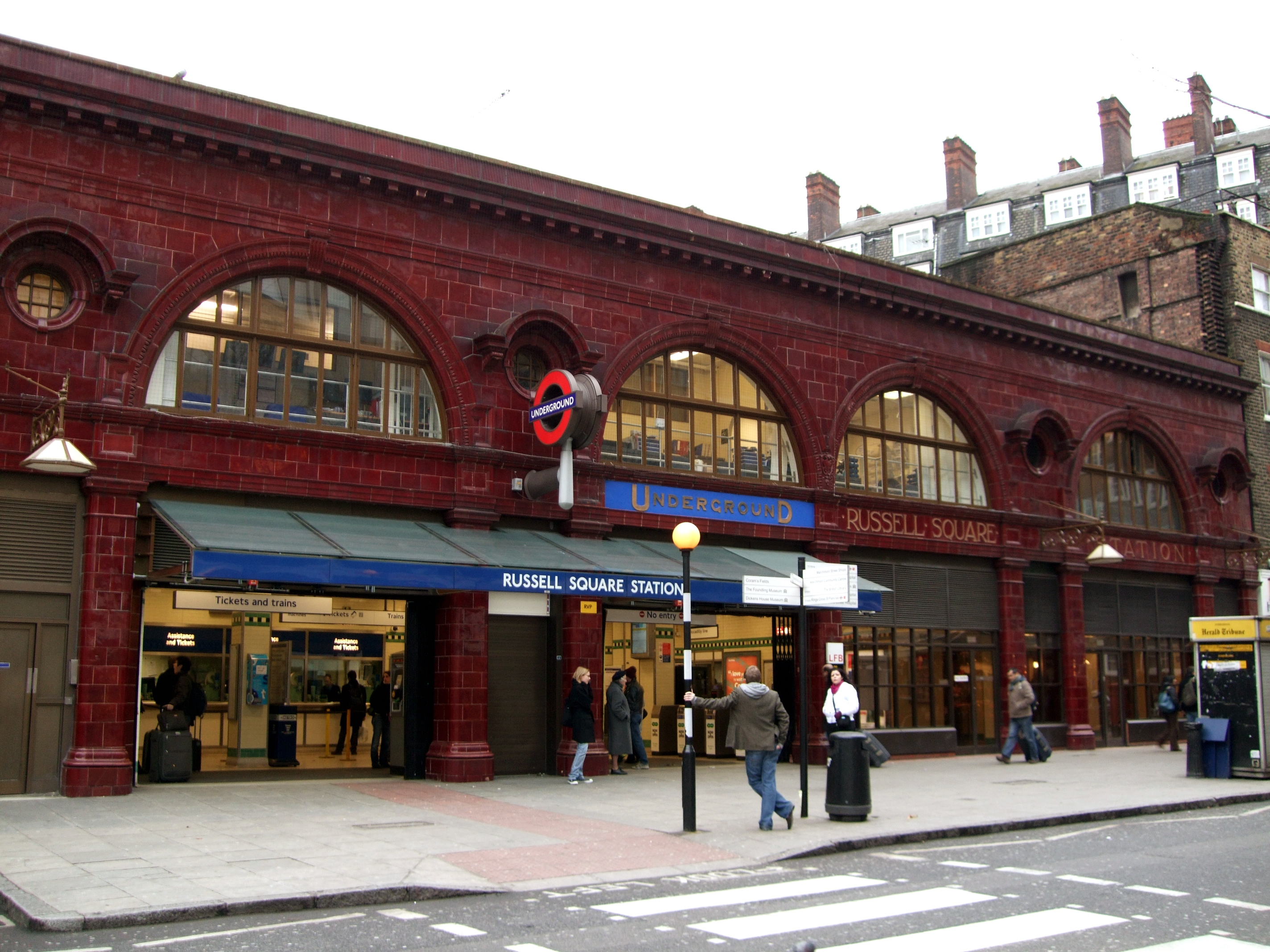
Russell Square station

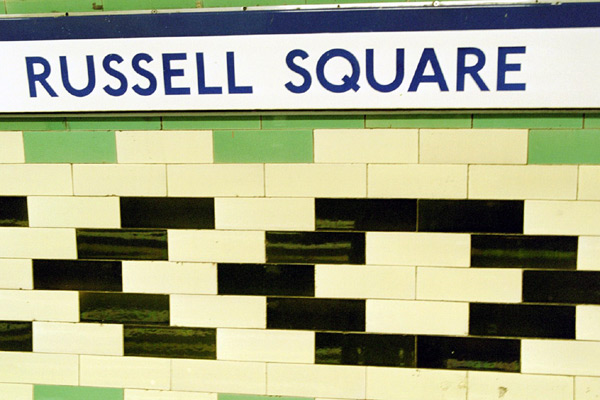
One of the variety of platform tiling patterns designed by Green

Green developed a unique Modern Style (British Art Nouveau style) style for the ground level station buildings, adapted to suit the individual station location. They were constructed as two-storey buildings with a structural steel frame – then a new form of construction recently imported from the United States – providing the large internal spaces needed for ticket halls and lift shafts (the first escalators were introduced in 1911). The exterior elevations were clad in non-loadbearing ox-blood red (sang de boeuf) glazed terracotta (faïence) blocks, provided by the Burmantofts Pottery. The ground floor was divided into wide bays by columns, allowing separate entrances and exits, and also providing space for retail outlets.

The design also featured large semi-circular windows at first floor level (occasionally with circular oculi) and a heavy dentilated cornice above. A broad strip between the two floors announced the name of the station in capital letters. The station buildings were constructed with flat roofs with the deliberate aim of encouraging commercial office development above, another benefit of the load-bearing structural steel frame.

The interior was tiled in green and white, with decorative details. At platform level, the stations were provided with a standardised tiling design incorporating the station name, but with quickly identified individual colour schemes and geometric tile patterns formed in repeating panels along the platform length. Directional signs were also included in the tile designs. The tiled surfaces created a unifying theme, and proved easy to maintain.

The railways were to open in 1906 and 1907, and Green was notified in June 1907 that the contract would be terminated at the end of that year. He was elected a Fellow of the RIBA in 1907, including details of his work for the UERL as part of his submission.

Many of Green's station buildings survive, although internal modifications have seen most of his ticket hall designs altered to suit later developments. At platform levels a number of the original tiling schemes survive today or have, as at Lambeth North and Marylebone, been reproduced in recent years to the original pattern. A number of the surviving buildings are Grade II listed buildings: Aldwych, Belsize Park, Caledonian Road, Chalk Farm, Covent Garden, Gloucester Road, Holloway Road, Oxford Circus, Mornington Crescent, Russell Square and South Kensington. His work was continued by his assistant, Stanley Heaps. The designs remain instantly recognisable: the screen appearance of the fictitious Walford East Underground station from the BBC soap opera EastEnders is inspired by Green's designs.

== Leslie Green stations ==
Bakerloo line
Stations between Edgware Road and Elephant & Castle inclusive constructed by BS&WR with station buildings designed by Leslie Green:

- Edgware Road – separate building from the District, Circle or Hammersmith & City lines station
- Great Central – renamed Marylebone in 1917. The original building was destroyed in WWII.
- Baker Street – demolished
- Regent's Park – accessed via a subway and never had a surface building
- Oxford Circus
- Piccadilly Circus – rebuilt in the 1920s, demolished in the 1990s
- Trafalgar Square - renamed Charing Cross in 1979, never had a station building
- Embankment - never had a station building
- Waterloo – rebuilt in the 1950s
- Kennington Road – renamed Lambeth North in 1917
- Elephant & Castle – South London House (3 floors of offices) built over the station in 1907

Piccadilly line
Stations between Finsbury Park and Gloucester Road inclusive constructed by GNP&BR with station buildings designed by Leslie Green:

- Gillespie Road – renamed Arsenal in 1932, rebuilt in the 1930s
- Holloway Road
- Caledonian Road
- York Road – station closed in 1932, but building remains
- King's Cross – renamed King's Cross St Pancras in 1927 and demolished later
- Russell Square
- Holborn The original station façades on Kingsway and High Holborn were uniquely of granite but were destroyed by 1930s replacements. The adjacent façades at ground and first floor of the building in which the station is situated were built to the same design using portland stone.
- Strand – renamed Aldwych in 1915. Station closed in 1994, but building remains and has been restored to close to original appearance
- Covent Garden
- Leicester Square
- Piccadilly Circus - rebuilt in the 1920s, building demolished in the 1990s
- Dover Street – renamed Green Park and entrance relocated in 1933 and building demolished in the 1960s.
- Down Street – station closed in 1932, but building remains
- Hyde Park Corner – building is not used as station access after 2010
- Knightsbridge - entrance relocated and main entrance demolished; facade of rear entrance at corner of Basil Street and Hoopers Court remained after new entrance was built and is incorporated into another building
- Brompton Road – station closed in 1934 and mostly demolished although the side elevation remains
- South Kensington - entrance not in use from the early 1970s
- Gloucester Road - entrance not in use

Northern line
Stations between Hampstead and Archway and Charing Cross inclusive constructed by CCE&HR with station buildings designed by Leslie Green:

- Highgate - renamed Archway in 1947, demolished
- Tufnell Park
- Kentish Town
- South Kentish Town – station closed in 1924 but building remains.
- Golders Green
- Hampstead
- Belsize Park
- Chalk Farm
- Camden Town
- Mornington Crescent
- Euston – surface building not used to access station after 1914; due to be demolished for the construction of new Euston mainline station
- Euston Road – renamed Warren Street in 1908, rebuilt in 1933.
- Tottenham Court Road –renamed Goodge Street in 1908.
- Oxford Street – renamed Tottenham Court Road in 1908, never had a station building
- Leicester Square
- Charing Cross - never had a surface building

== Death ==
Green contracted pulmonary tuberculosis and died on 31 August 1908 at a sanatorium in Mundesley-on-Sea, Norfolk.

== See also ==
- Charles Holden, another architect known for his work on London Underground railway stations in the decades following Green’s death
