= York Way =

Street in central London

Coordinates: 51.5398°N 0.1242°W

- Interactive map of York Way
- Former names: Mayde Lane (1467), Maiden Lane (1735), York Road (19th century)
- Part of: A5200
- Length: 1 mi (1.6 km)
- Location: Islington / Camden boundary, London
- Nearest metro station: King's Cross St. Pancras tube station (nearby); York Road tube station (disused)
- From: Pentonville Road / Euston Road
- Major junctions: Bingfield Street
- To: Brecknock Road

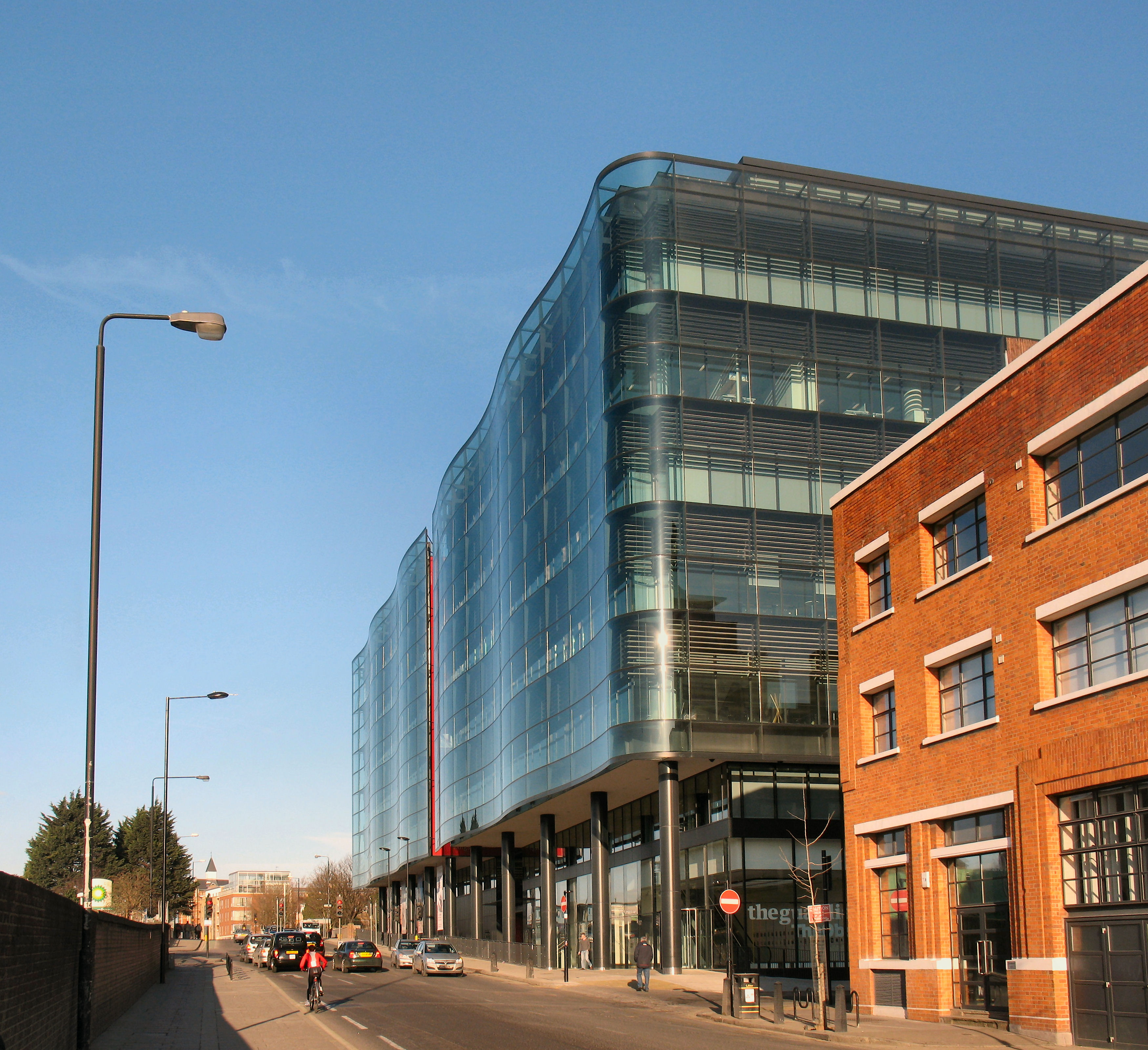
Kings Place from York Way

York Way (part of the A5200) is a major road in the London Borough of Islington, running north for one mile from the junction of Pentonville Road and Euston Road, adjacent to King's Cross railway station towards Kentish Town and Holloway. At its northern end, the road becomes Brecknock Road. For its entire length York Way forms the boundary between the London Boroughs of Islington and Camden.

== History ==
York Way was named Mayde Lane (1467) and Maiden Lane (1735) (commemorated in the Maiden Lane Estate, Maiden Lane Bridge – over the Regent's Canal and the former Maiden Lane railway station), it became York Road in the 19th century, and the current name was only adopted in 1938. It had been a significant route in the Middle Ages, between Gray's Inn and High Barnet.

The modern road passes the new Kings Place development, Bingfield Park, crosses the Regent's Canal, and runs alongside the King's Cross redevelopment area.

Near the northern end of the road was the Metropolitan Cattle Market; now the Market Estate and Caledonian Park.

== Transport ==
At the southern end, after the mainline King's Cross station was the smaller suburban York Road station, with services to Moorgate, which closed in 1976.

After the canal the road is adjacent to the former Kings Cross goods station and, standing on the corner of Bingfield Street and, the red-tiled surface building of the disused York Road Underground station is located. The station was closed in 1932 and was served by the Piccadilly line.

Between here and the former Maiden Lane railway station the road was rebuilt in the 2000s to enable the tunnel entrance for High Speed 1 to be constructed.

== See also ==
- Maiden Lane, Covent Garden
