= Arsenal tube station =

London Underground station

Arsenal
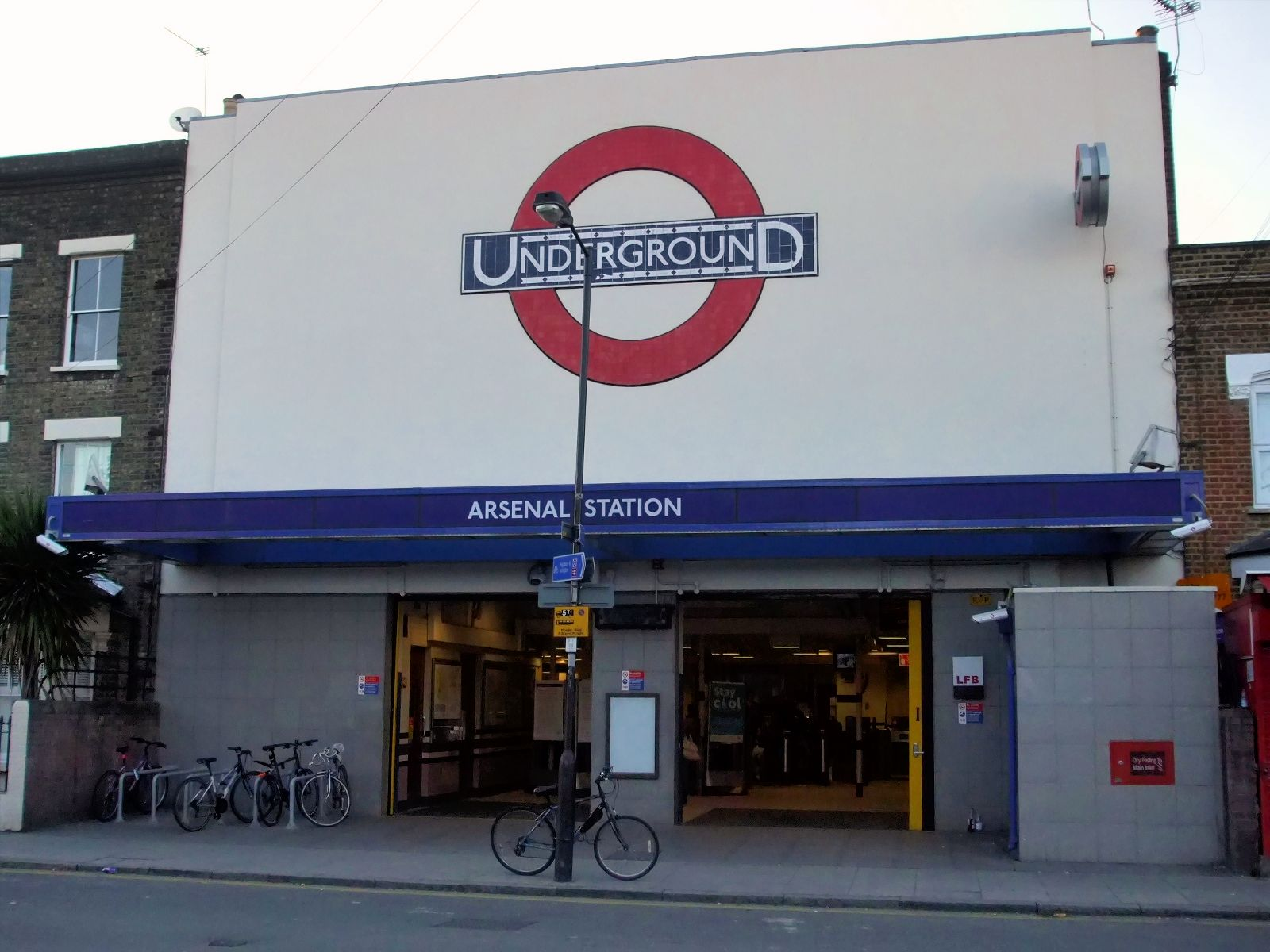
- Station entrance
- Interactive map of Arsenal

General information
- Location: Highbury
- Local authority: London Borough of Islington
- Managed by: London Underground
- Number of platforms: 2
- Fare zone: 2

London Underground annual entry and exit
- 2020: ▼1.00 million
- 2021: ▲1.21 million
- 2022: ▲2.12 million
- 2023: ▲2.20 million
- 2024: ▼2.18 million

Railway companies
- Original company: Great Northern, Piccadilly and Brompton Railway

Key dates
- 15 December 1906: Opened as Gillespie Road
- 31 October 1932: Renamed Arsenal (Highbury Hill)
- c. 1960: Renamed Arsenal

Other information
- External links: TfL station info page
- Coordinates: 51.55861°N 0.10583°W

Arsenal is a London Underground station, located in Highbury, London. It is on the Piccadilly line, between Holloway Road and Finsbury Park stations. It is in London fare zone 2.

Originally known as Gillespie Road, the station was renamed in 1932 after Arsenal Football Club, who at the time played at the nearby Highbury Stadium. It is the only tube station named directly after a football club. (Note: Several tube stations, including West Ham and Wimbledon, share their names with football clubs, but only Arsenal was named directly after a club rather than the associated area.) Although Highbury Stadium closed in 2006, the station retains its name and is still used by spectators attending matches at Arsenal's nearby Emirates Stadium.

== Location ==
The station is located on a narrow Victorian residential street, away from any main roads. It is also unusual in not having any bus routes pass its entrance, though routes 4, 19, 106 and 236 serve nearby Blackstock Road.

== History ==
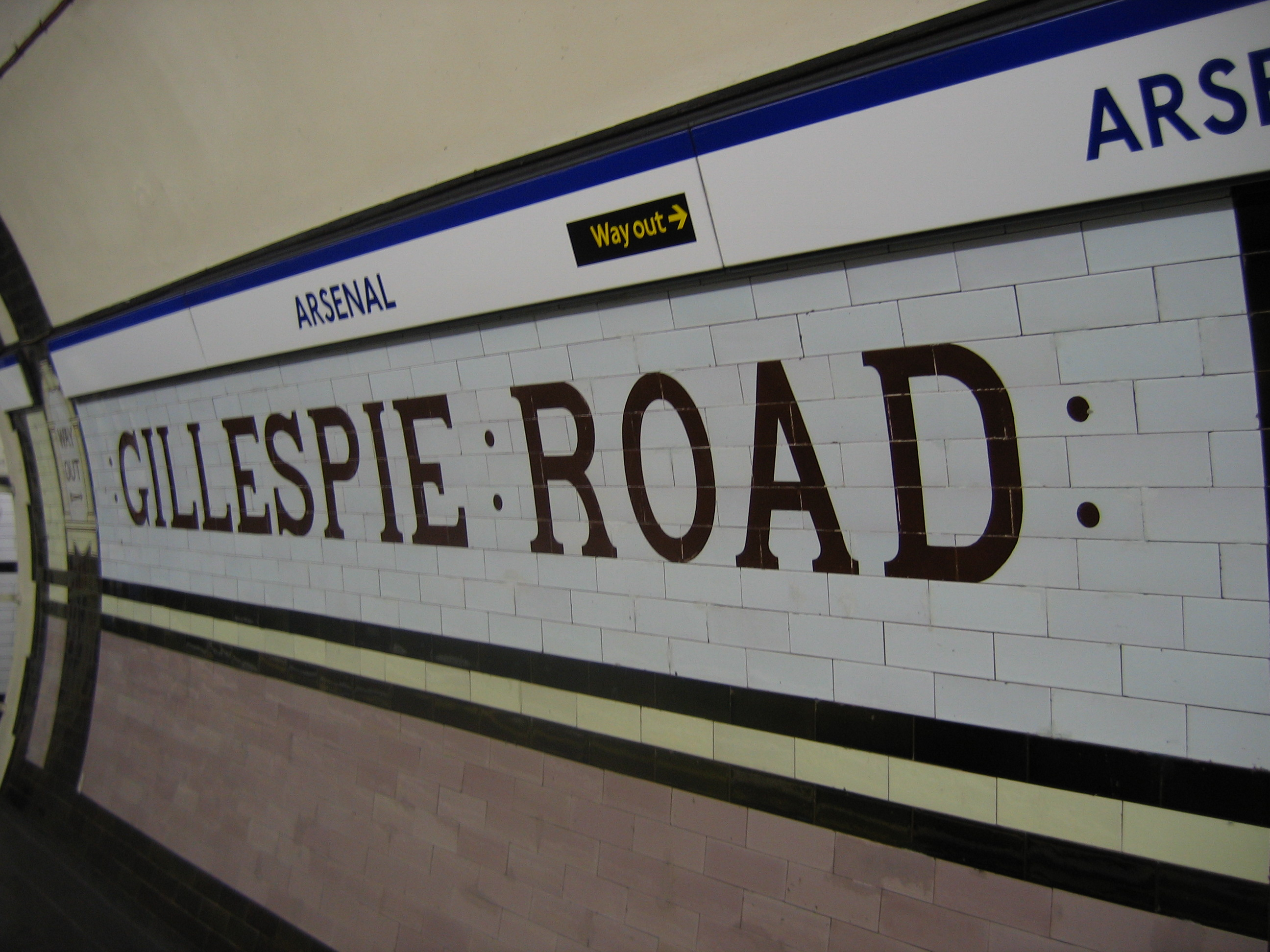
Tiling on the platform indicates the station's previous guise as "Gillespie Road".

Arsenal tube station was opened by the Great Northern, Piccadilly and Brompton Railway (GNP&BR) as Gillespie Road on 15 December 1906. The GNP&BR was later renamed the Piccadilly line after the consolidation and nationalisation of the Tube network as London Underground. The original station building and ticket hall were red terracotta-clad buildings designed by Leslie Green, similar to neighbouring stations such as Holloway Road and Caledonian Road.

At the time of Gillespie Road's construction, it served a residential area and a local divinity college. In 1913, Arsenal F.C. moved from Woolwich to Highbury on the site of the college's playing fields, and the club's presence there eventually led to a campaign for a change of name. Arsenal manager Herbert Chapman was a particularly keen advocate, and on 31 October 1932 it was renamed Arsenal (Highbury Hill). The station was expanded in the 1930s, when the original station building was demolished and replaced by a wider building of a more modern design.

The suffix was dropped from the station's name some time around 1960, giving the current name of Arsenal. (Note: An early 1960 edition of the Tube map shows the "Highbury Hill" suffix but one from later in 1960 shows it without. No subsequent maps include the suffix.) The original tiled walls of the platforms still bear the Gillespie Road name, spelt out in large letters. In 2007, the station underwent a major upgrade; as part of this the wall tiling was completely restored, the floor resurfaced and an electronic Tannoy system was introduced.

== Station layout ==
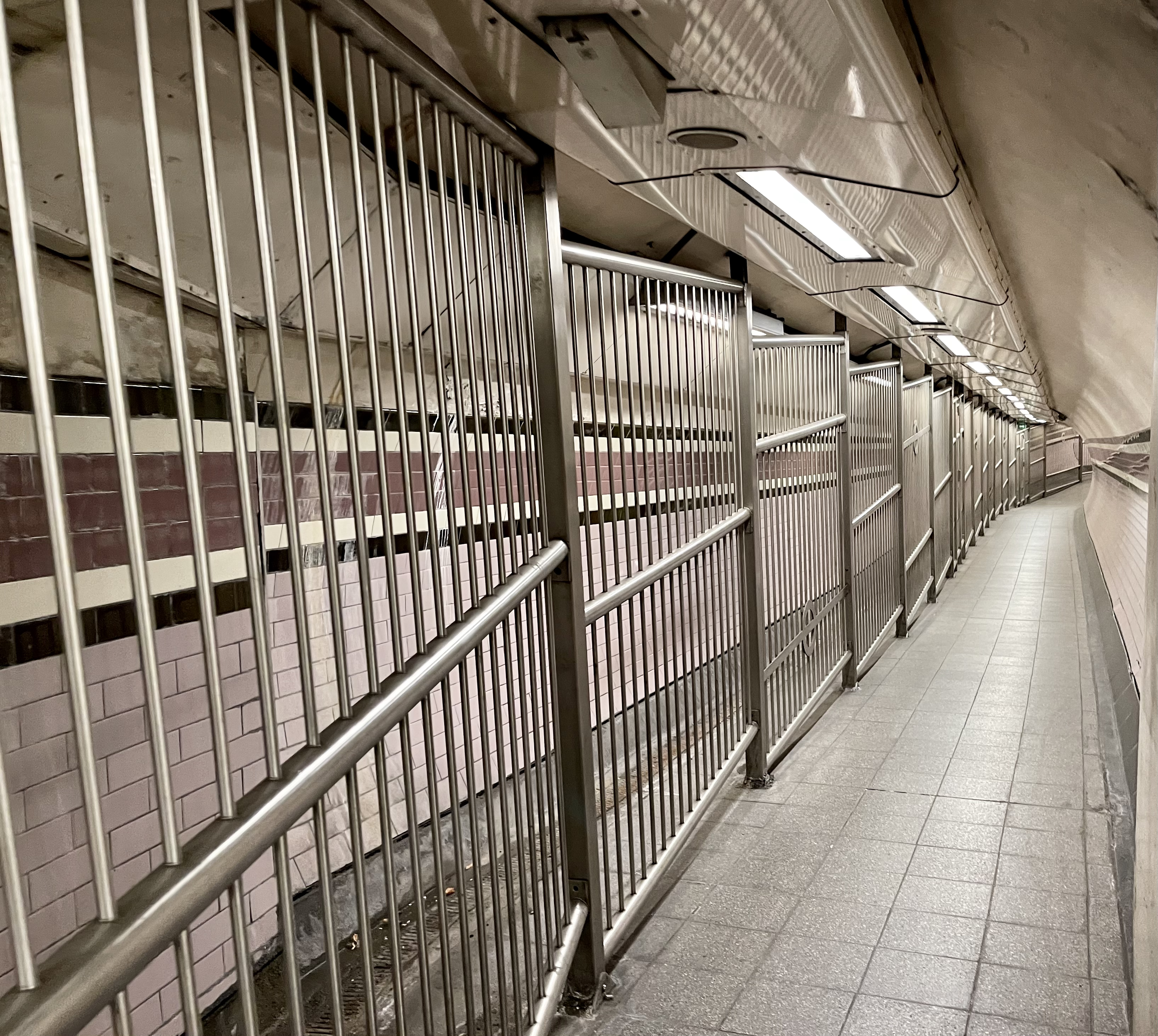
Passageway linking the ticket office to the platforms, looking towards the latter. Note tidal flow segregation, in operation on football match days. The fans would use the wider section.

When it was first built, the station building was squeezed between residential properties on each side, occupying the width of just two terraced houses. Even after the surface building was rebuilt and widened in the early 1930s, with a further house being demolished, it has one of the narrowest frontages of any Underground station.

Unusually for a "deep level" tube station, Arsenal possesses neither escalators nor lifts. Instead, a sloping passageway leads down to the platforms. This is due to the tunnels being both relatively shallow at this point and situated some distance from the station entrance (being underneath the East Coast Main Line). There are short flights of stairs at both ends of the passageway, so the station is not wheelchair accessible. When the station was rebuilt in the early 1930s, an extra tunnel was dug to platform level from the main access passage in anticipation of increased traffic. This is now used to handle the large crowds on match days. The station has a "tidal" system unique on the Underground network, with a narrow section on one side divided from the main passageway by a full-height fence. The narrow section is used on match days for the lighter flow, according to time of day—for passengers catching trains before matches, or leaving the station afterwards.

== Usage ==
Map of Arsenal's old and new stadiums in relation to Arsenal tube station

The station is considerably less busy than other stations on the same stretch of line. In 2007 only 2,735,000 entries and exits were recorded, compared with Holloway Road's 7,487,000 and Caledonian Road's 5,333,000.

In 2006 Arsenal F.C. moved to a new stadium, the Emirates Stadium. The stadium is on the site of Ashburton Grove, a former industrial estate approximately 500 metres (1,600 ft) west of Highbury, and marginally closer to Drayton Park (on the Northern City Line) and Holloway Road stations. (Note: This is as measured from the pitch itself; measured from the main entrance to the stadium complex in the northeast corner, Arsenal remains the closest station.) However, Drayton Park is closed on match days due to its small platform size and infrequent service (before 2015 it had no weekend service at all), and trains do not stop at Holloway Road before and after matches to prevent overcrowding. Arsenal station meanwhile is still within easy walking distance of the new stadium's main entrance and is recommended by the club for use on match days. The station thus still retains the "Arsenal" name and, along with Finsbury Park and Highbury & Islington, is still used by many Arsenal supporters to get to matches.

As part of the commemoration of Arsenal F.C.'s move, a temporary mural was placed along the walls of the station passageways as part of London Underground's Art on the Underground scheme. It was unveiled in February 2006 and removed in September.

== Services and connections ==
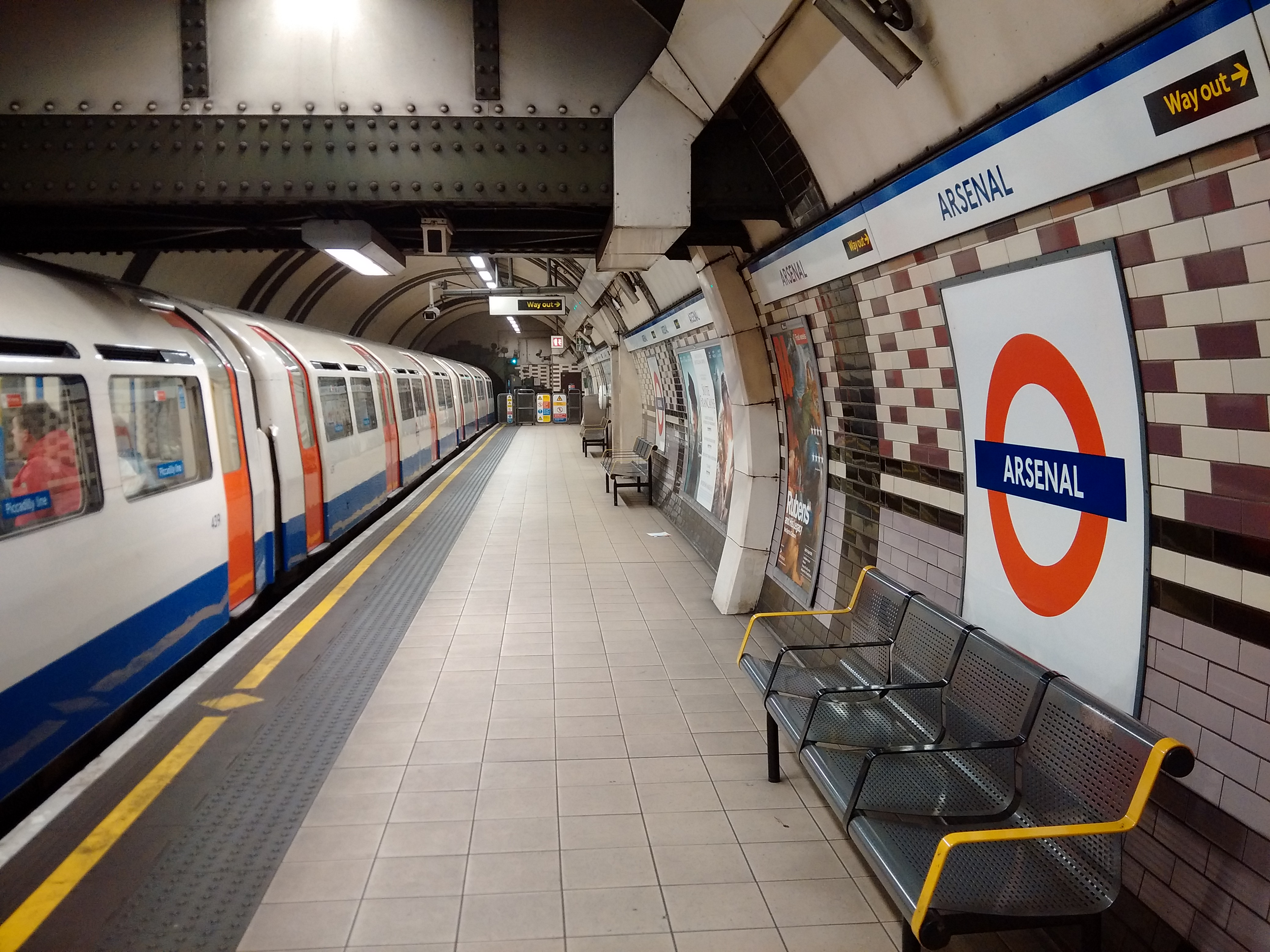
A Piccadilly line train at Arsenal

=== Services ===
Arsenal station is on the Piccadilly line in London fare zone 2. It is between Holloway Road to the west and Finsbury Park to the east. Train frequencies vary throughout the day, but generally operate every 2–6 minutes between 06:22 and 00:19 in both directions.

Preceding station	London Underground	Following station
Holloway Road towards Uxbridge, Rayners Lane or Heathrow Airport (Terminal 4 or Terminal 5)	Piccadilly line	Finsbury Park towards Cockfosters or Arnos Grove

=== Connections ===
No bus routes directly serve the station. However, various London Bus routes are nearby.
