= Holloway Road tube station =

London Underground station

Holloway Road
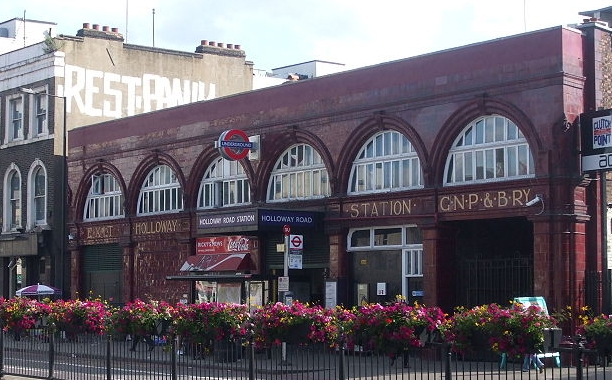
- Station building
- Interactive map of Holloway Road

General information
- Location: Holloway
- Local authority: Islington
- Managed by: London Underground
- Number of platforms: 2
- Fare zone: 2

London Underground annual entry and exit
- 2020: ▼2.26 million
- 2021: ▲2.88 million
- 2022: ▲5.23 million
- 2023: ▼5.11 million
- 2024: ▲5.27 million

Key dates
- 15 December 1906: Opened

Listed status
- Listing grade: II
- Entry number: 1195635
- Added to list: 17 May 1994; 32 years ago

Other information
- External links: TfL station info page
- Coordinates: 51.55306°N 0.11194°W

Holloway Road is a London Underground station. It is on the Piccadilly line between Caledonian Road and Arsenal stations, and is in London fare zone 2. It opened on 15 December 1906. The station is adjacent to the site of the former Holloway and Caledonian Road railway station.

== Design and location ==
The architect of the station was Leslie Green who built it for the Great Northern, Piccadilly and Brompton Railway (Now part of London Transport) in the Modern Style (British Art Nouveau style). The building is listed by English Heritage as Grade II.

The station is close to the Emirates Stadium, the home of Arsenal football club. As part of the planning permission £5m was due to be spent expanding the current station to cope with increased passenger numbers on match days. However subsequent studies showed that to ensure the station could cope with the numbers the lifts would have to be replaced with escalators which would cost £60m. As a result, the redevelopment plans were put on hold and now at match times the station is exit only, and before a match eastbound trains do not call.

== History ==
The station was constructed by the Great Northern, Piccadilly and Brompton Railway and was built with two lift shafts, but only one was ever used for lifts. The second shaft was the site of an experimental spiral escalator which was built by the American inventor of escalators, Jesse W. Reno. The experiment was not successful and was never used by the public. In the 1990s, remains of the escalator equipment were excavated from the base of the lift shaft and stored at the London Transport Museum Depot in Acton. From the platforms, a second exit no longer in use is visible and leads to the back of the used lift shaft.

Refurbishment works completed in 2008 included the installation of a new public address system, replacement of aging customer information screens, and other aesthetic changes to improve the look, feel and security of the station. This includes improved lighting and a dramatic increase in the number of CCTV cameras. In May 2023, works to replace the two 1980s lifts started with the work due to take until September 2024, replacing one lift at a time. During Emirates Stadium events the station was closed to prevent overcrowding.

== Connections ==
London Buses serve the station with a number of day and nighttime routes.

Preceding station	London Underground	Following station
Caledonian Road towards Uxbridge, Rayners Lane or Heathrow Airport (Terminal 4 or Terminal 5)	Piccadilly line	Arsenal towards Cockfosters or Arnos Grove
