= Holloway and Caledonian Road railway station =

Former railway station in England

Holloway & Caledonian Road
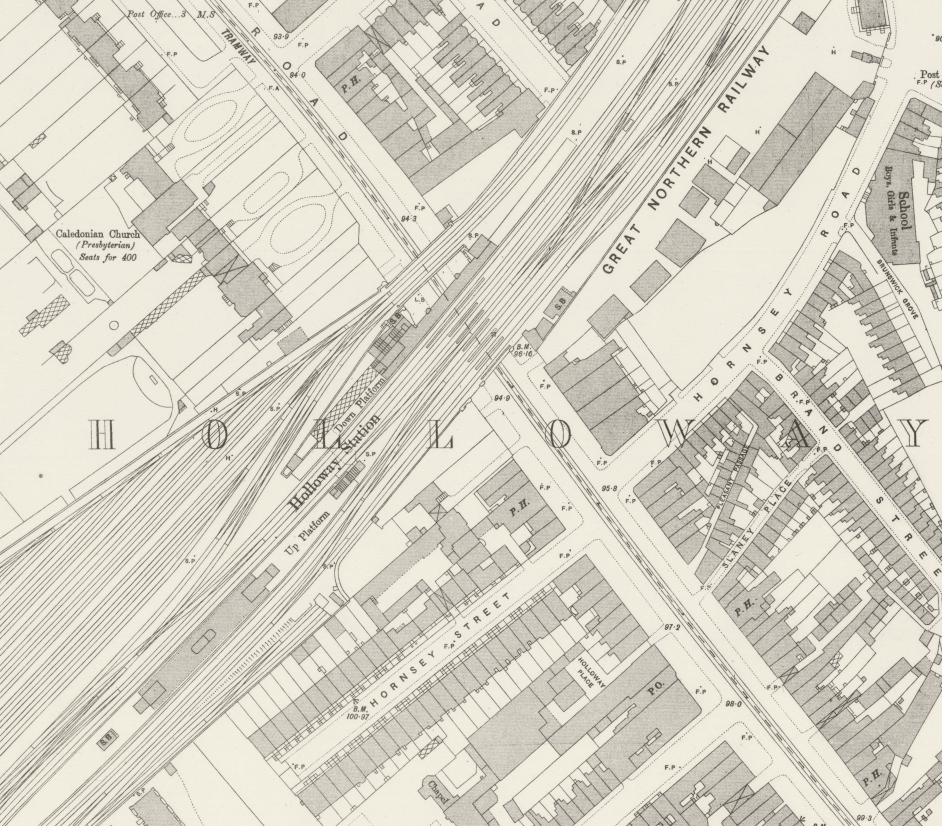
- Holloway & Caledonian Road station, 1895

- Location of Holloway & Caledonian Road in Greater London
- Location: Holloway
- Local authority: Islington
- Owner: Great Northern Railway
- Number of platforms: 2

Key dates
- 1852: Opened (Up platform)
- 1856: Opened (Down platform
- 1915: Closed
- Replaced by: none

Other information
- Coordinates: 51.552900°N 0.113568°W

Holloway & Caledonian Road (originally Holloway) was a railway station opened in 1852 by the Great Northern Railway (GNR). It was located on Holloway Road, in Holloway and between the railway's terminus at King's Cross to the south and Finsbury Park to the north. The station closed in 1915.

King's Cross station opened on 14 October 1852, replacing the temporary terminus at Maiden Lane which closed. At its opening, Holloway & Caledonian Road had only a single up platform available for the use of alighting passengers; the first stop for passengers travelling from King's Cross was Finsbury Park. Full services in both directions were available from 1 August 1856. The platforms were located partly on the railway's viaduct and partly on the railway bridge over Holloway Road.

As with many other inner London stations, the development of alternative transport services impacted the number of passengers using the station, particularly the adjacent Holloway Road station opened in 1906 by the Great Northern, Piccadilly and Brompton Railway (now the London Underground's Piccadilly line). The GNR station was closed on 1 October 1915. The station buildings, part of the viaduct and the bridge that it was located on have been demolished.

Preceding station	Historical railways	Following station
London King's Cross; Line and station open	Great Northern Railway; East Coast Main Line	Finsbury Park; Line and station open
