= Maiden Lane railway stations =

Two similarly named former railway stations in Camden, north London

There have been two railway stations named Maiden Lane in the present London Borough of Camden, in north London, England. The stations, named after the nearby road (now York Way), were close to each other, but on different lines.

== Great Northern Railway station ==
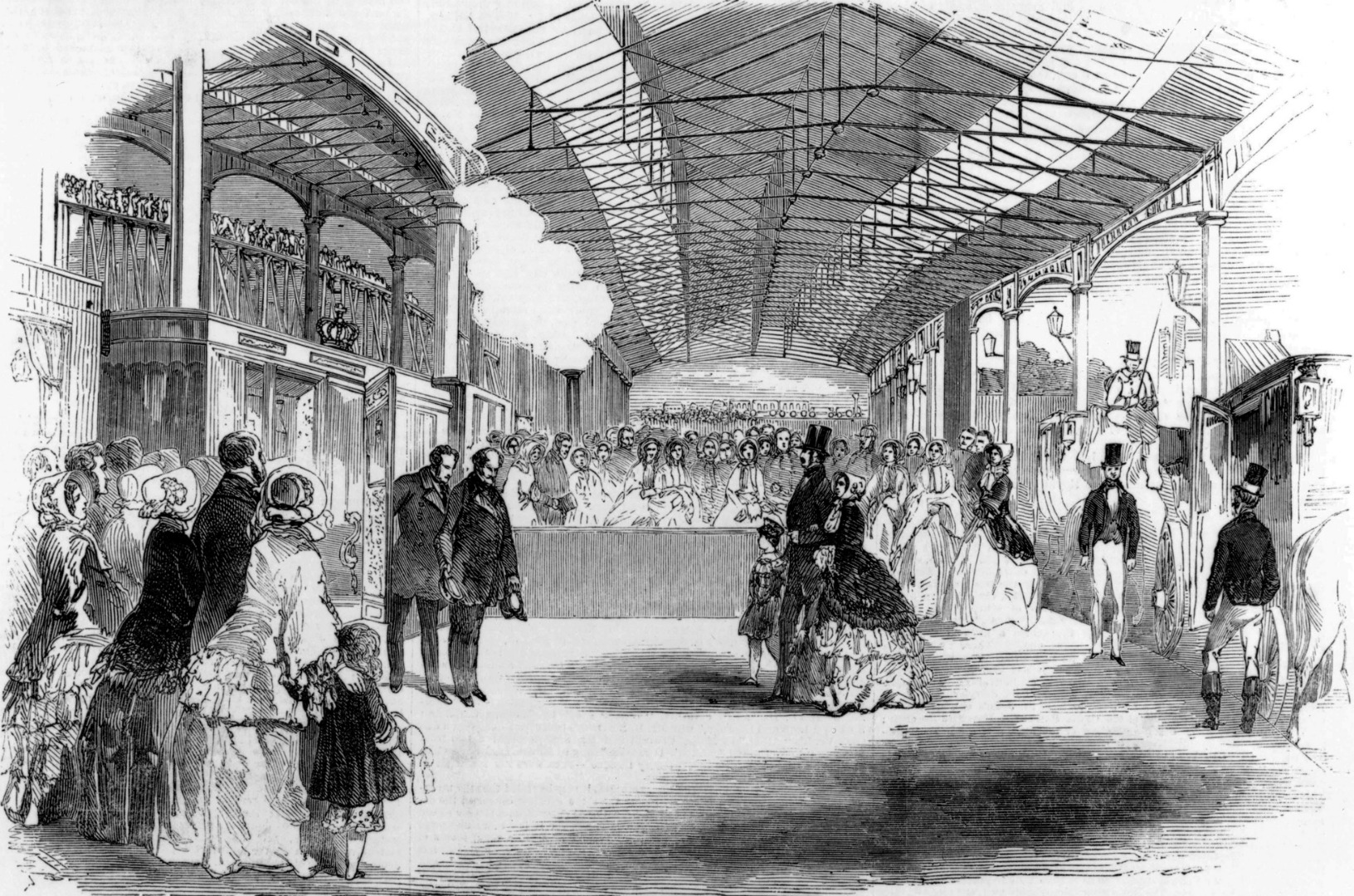
Queen Victoria visits Maiden Lane (GNR); the photograph of her visit was published in the Illustrated London News on 30 August 1851

This station, opened on 7 August 1850 as the "London Temporary Passenger Station", was the temporary London terminus of the Great Northern Railway. It was opened so that the railway could earn revenue from visitors travelling to visit the Great Exhibition of 1851. Covered by a double-span train shed, there were two platforms and two release roads. The main station buildings were on the down side of the station. The station served passengers until 14 October 1852, when the last section of the East Coast Main Line and King's Cross station were opened. The station subsequently served as a potato warehouse before it was demolished, some time after 1874.

== North London Railway station ==
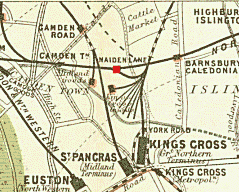
The North London Railway station shown on a map from 1899

On 7 December 1850, the East and West India Docks and Birmingham Junction Railway (later to become the North London Railway) opened from Highbury & Islington to its Camden Town station (since renamed Camden Road), with intermediate stations at Maiden Lane and Caledonian Road & Barnsbury.

This Maiden Lane station – 51.540917°N 0.127051°W –- was a short distance northwest of the Great Northern Railway station and near the present High Speed 1 tunnel portal. It also served King's Cross Goods Yard. It closed in 1916 or 1917, after the LNWR in 1916 electrified the southern pair of the four tracks for passenger services, leaving the northern pair, on which the station was built, solely for steam-hauled goods traffic.

Camden Council has suggested this station could be rebuilt and reopened, in conjunction with the King's Cross Central redevelopment project.

In June 2017, the Council were talking with TfL on the possible reopening of Maiden Lane and York Road stations which it wished to reopen with Maiden Lane more likely to reopen than York Road.
