= Caledonian Road tube station =

London Underground station

Caledonian Road
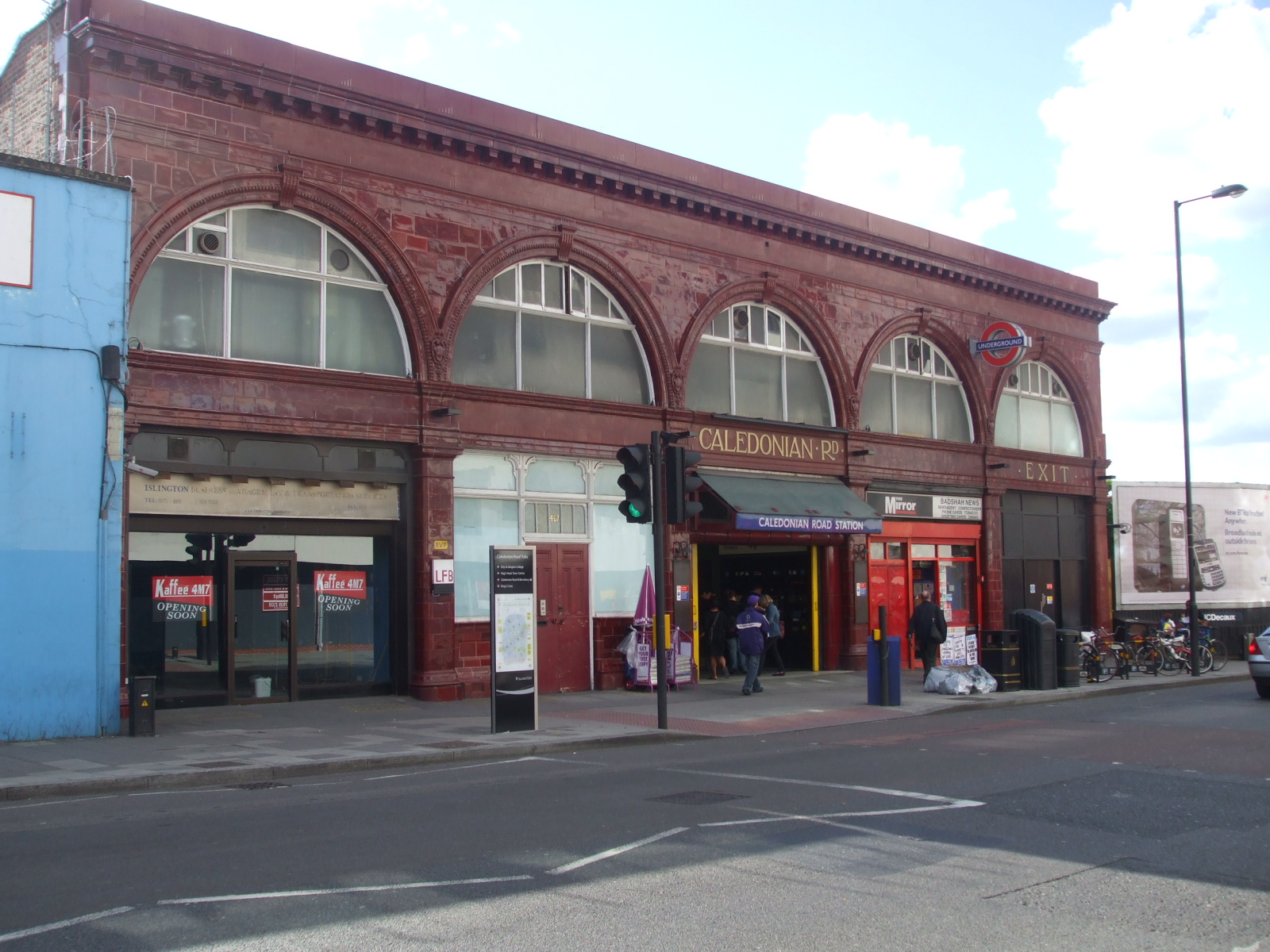
- Station building
- Interactive map of Caledonian Road

General information
- Location: Holloway
- Local authority: Islington
- Managed by: London Underground
- Number of platforms: 2
- Accessible: Yes
- Fare zone: 2

London Underground annual entry and exit
- 2021: ▲2.42 million
- 2022: ▲4.18 million
- 2023: ▲4.35 million
- 2024: ▼3.69 million
- 2025: ▲4.01 million

Railway companies
- Original company: Great Northern, Piccadilly and Brompton Railway

Key dates
- 15 December 1906: Station opened

Listed status
- Listing grade: II
- Entry number: 1401086
- Added to list: 20 July 2011

Other information
- External links: TfL station info page
- Coordinates: 51.54833°N 0.11861°W

Caledonian Road is a London Underground station. It is on the Piccadilly line between King's Cross St. Pancras and Holloway Road stations, and is in London fare zone 2. It was opened on 15 December 1906 by the Great Northern, Piccadilly and Brompton Railway. The building was designed by Leslie Green.

The station is located on Caledonian Road in Holloway, north London. The station continues to use lifts, never having been upgraded to escalators. Unusually for stations of its era, the lifts descend directly to platform level with no secondary staircases. In recent times this has meant that the station is now advertised as "Step Free" on line maps without rebuilding work taking place. The station is a Grade II listed building.

The next northbound station from Caledonian Road is Holloway Road while the next southbound station was originally York Road. This station closed in 1932, but can still be seen from trains. York Road was planned to be open to relieve congestion at King's Cross St. Pancras.

== Temporary closure ==
The station was scheduled to be closed from 4 January 2016 until mid-August 2016, to enable the two lifts to be upgraded. A local campaign against the closure emerged via a Change.org petition and achieved close to 7,500 supporters. The petitioners claimed that the station could be kept open while new lifts were installed in two unused lift shafts. This was previously done when lifts were replaced in 1987 and the station remained open throughout.

In January 2016, Islington Council announced that it had applied for a Judicial Review of Transport for London's plan, to be heard on 25 February 2016. On 19 January 2016, Underground management announced that the closure plan had been shelved and that new arrangements would be made to keep the station open during lift refurbishment.

== Services ==
Caledonian Road station is on the Piccadilly line in London fare zone 2. It is between King's Cross St. Pancras to the west and Holloway Road to the east. The typical off-peak service from this station is as follows:

- 12 tph (trains per hour) to Heathrow Airport via Central London
  - 6 of these to terminals 4 and 1,2,3
  - 6 of these to terminals 1,2,3 and 5
- 3 tph to Rayners Lane via Central London
- 3 tph to Uxbridge via Central London and Rayners Lane
- 3 tph to Northfields via Central London
- 18 tph to Cockfosters
- 3 tph to Arnos Grove

Preceding station	London Underground	Following station
King's Cross St Pancras towards Uxbridge, Rayners Lane or Heathrow Airport (Terminal 4 or Terminal 5)	Piccadilly line	Holloway Road towards Cockfosters or Arnos Grove
Former Route
York Road towards South Harrow	Piccadilly line (1906–32)	Holloway Road towards Finsbury Park

== Location ==
The station is close to Pentonville Prison and Caledonian Park, the site of the former Victorian Metropolitan Cattle Market, is a short distance away on Market Road.

== Platform level tiling ==
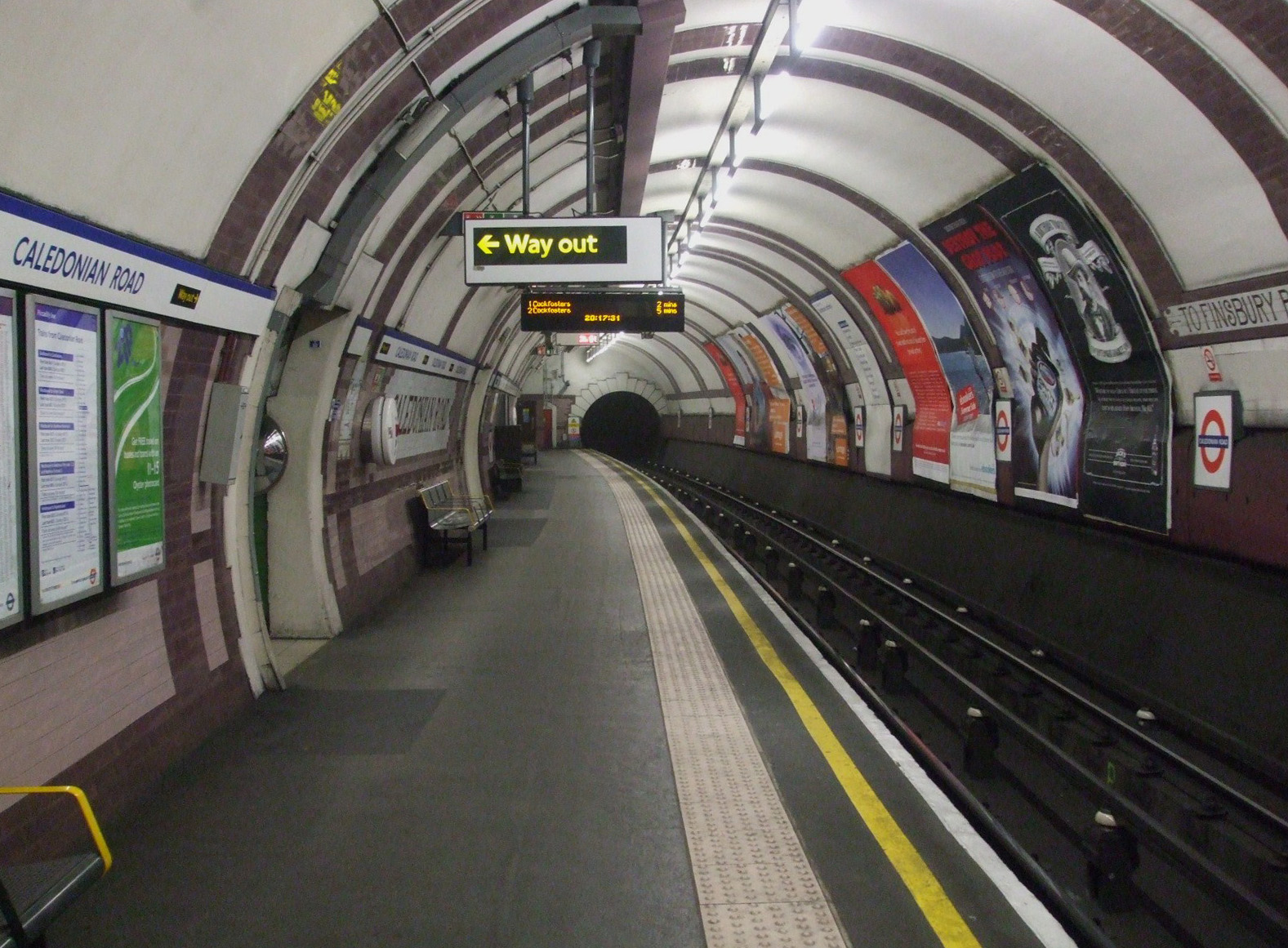
The platform at Caledonian Road showing its distinctive tilework and colours

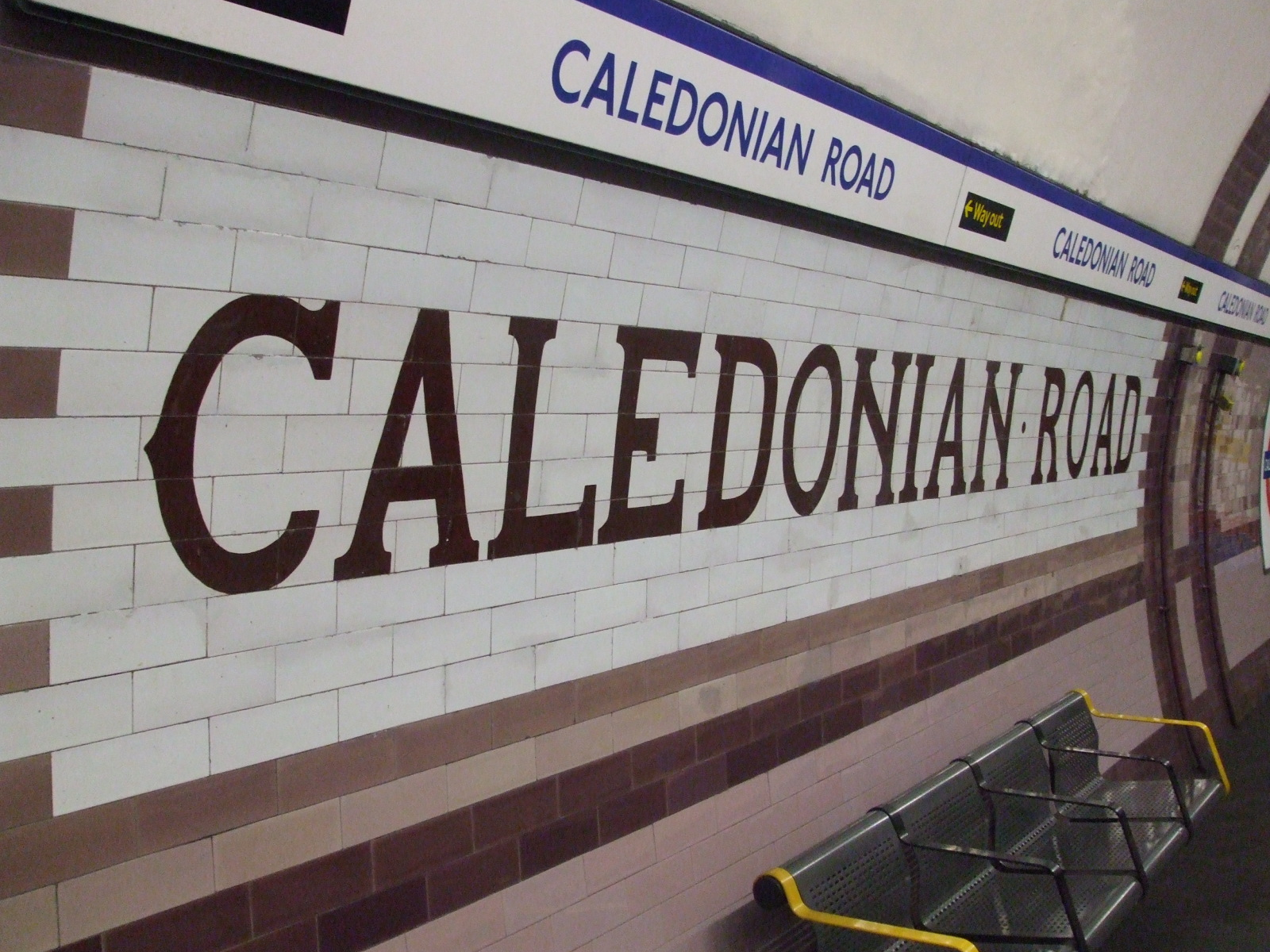
The distinctive nameplate and tilework pattern

The stations along the central part of the Piccadilly line, as well as some sections of the Northern line, were financed by Charles Yerkes, and are famous for the Leslie Green designed red station buildings and distinctive platform tiling. Each station has its own unique tile pattern and colours.

== Connections ==
- London Buses routes 17, 91 and night route N91 serve the station.
- Caledonian Road and Barnsbury station on the North London line is about half a mile to the south.
