= King's Cross St Pancras tube station =

London Underground station

King's Cross St Pancras
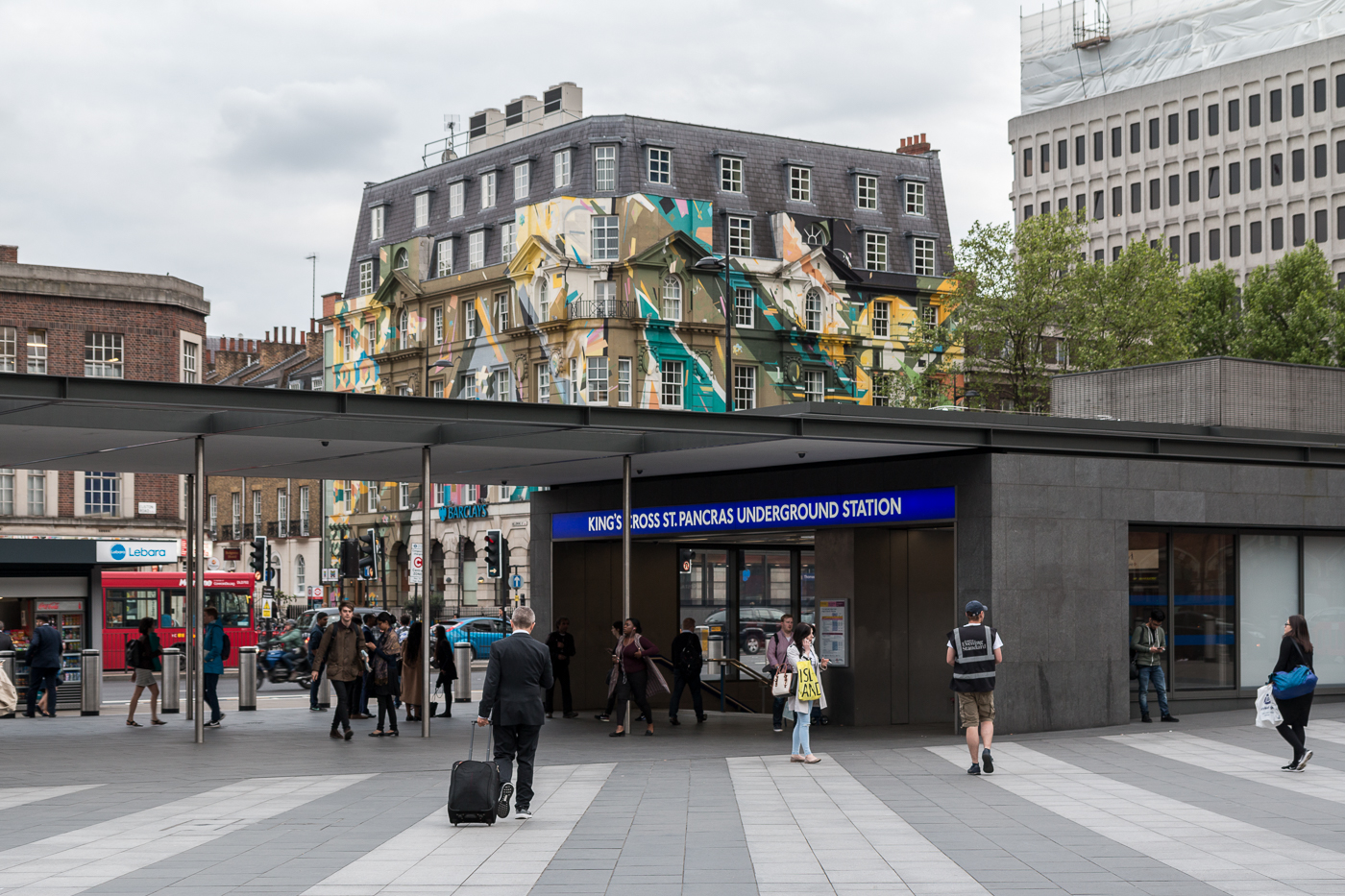
- Entrance on Euston Road on King's Cross station forecourt
- Interactive map of King's Cross St Pancras

General information
- Location: King's Cross / St Pancras
- Local authority: London Borough of Camden
- Managed by: London Underground
- Owner: London Underground
- Number of platforms: 8
- Accessible: Yes
- Fare zone: 1
- OSI: London King's Cross and London St Pancras Int'l

London Underground annual entry and exit
- 2021: ▲36.73 million
- 2022: ▲69.94 million
- 2023: ▲72.12 million
- 2024: ▲73.89 million
- 2025: ▼73.57 million

Key dates
- 10 January 1863: Opened (Metropolitan)
- 15 December 1906: Opened (GNP&BR)
- 11 May 1907: Opened (C&SLR)
- 1 December 1968: Opened (Victoria line)
- 18 November 1987: King's Cross fire

Other information
- Coordinates: 51.5302°N 0.1241°W

King's Cross St Pancras (/ˈkɪŋz ˈkrɒs sənt ˈpæŋkrəs/; also known as King's Cross & St Pancras International) is a London Underground station on Euston Road in the London Borough of Camden, Central London. It serves King's Cross and St Pancras main line stations in London fare zone 1, and is served by six lines: Circle, Hammersmith & City, Metropolitan, Northern, Piccadilly and Victoria. The station was one of the first to open on the network. As of 2024, it is the 2nd busiest station on the network for passenger entrances and exits combined.

On the Circle, Hammersmith & City and Metropolitan lines, the station is between Euston Square and Farringdon stations. On the Bank branch of the Northern line the station is between Euston and Angel stations, on the Piccadilly line it is between Russell Square and Caledonian Road stations, and on the Victoria line it is between Euston and Highbury & Islington stations.

The station opened in 1863 as part of the Metropolitan Railway, subsequently catering for the Hammersmith & City and Circle lines. It was expanded in 1868 with the opening of the City Widened Lines, and the Northern and Piccadilly platforms opened in the early 20th century. During the 1930s and 1940s, the station was restructured and partially rebuilt to cater for expanded traffic. The Victoria line connection opened in 1968. The 1987 King's Cross fire that killed 31 people is one of the deadliest accidents to occur on the Underground and resulted in widespread safety improvements and changes throughout the network. The station was extensively rebuilt in the early 21st century to cater for Eurostar services that moved from Waterloo to St Pancras, reopening in 2007.

== History ==
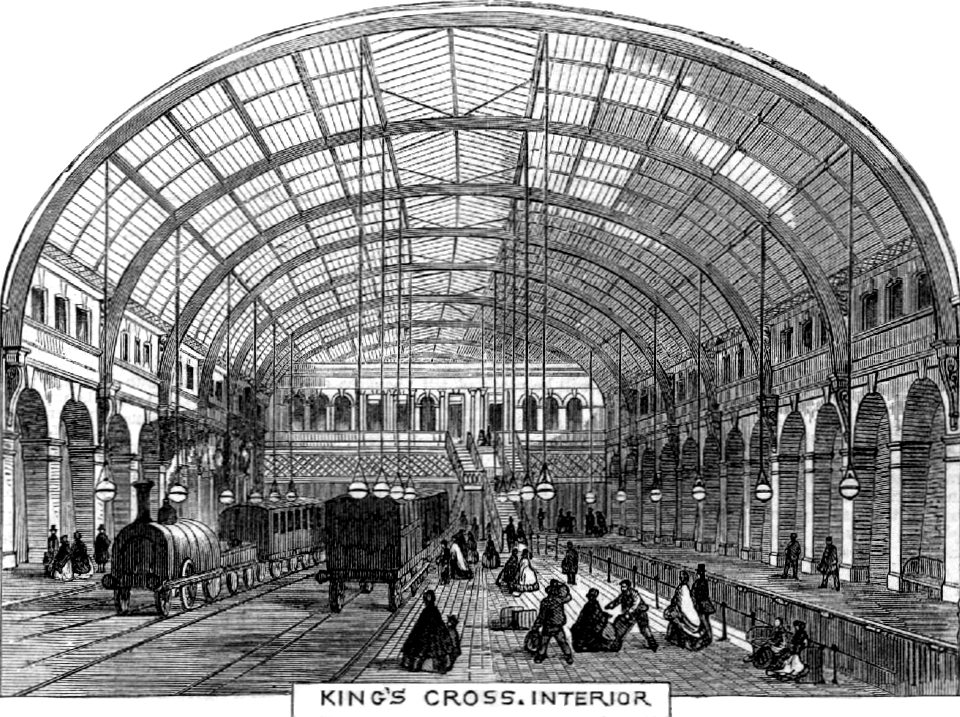
Interior

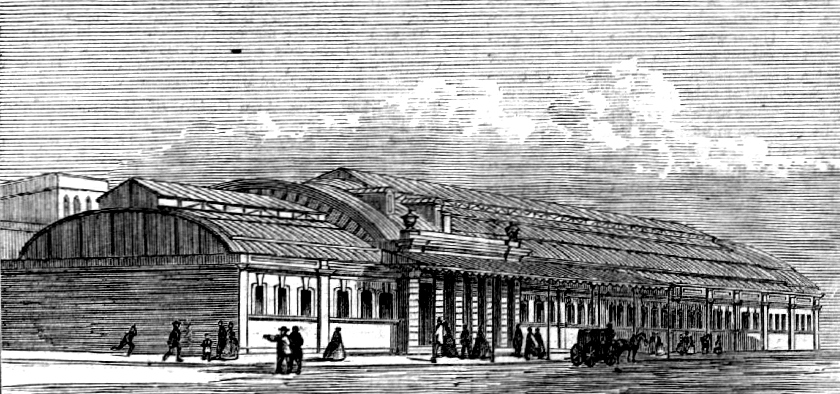
Exterior

Metropolitan Railway station,
1862 before opening

The first underground station at King's Cross was planned in 1851, during construction of the mainline station. The intention was to connect the Great Western Railway (GWR) at Paddington with the Great Northern Railway (GNR) at King's Cross. The line was opened as part of the original section of the Metropolitan Railway (MR) on 10 January 1863. It was reorganised in August 1868 to accommodate the City Widened Lines which allowed GNR and Metropolitan traffic to run along the line simultaneously. The same year, the Metropolitan built a link to the newly opened St Pancras station.

The Great Northern, Piccadilly and Brompton Railway (GNP&BR, now part of the Piccadilly line) platforms opened with the rest of the line on 15 December 1906, while the City & South London Railway (C&SLR, now part of the Northern line) opened on 11 May 1907. In 1927, this part of the station was renamed as King's Cross for St Pancras.

In 1933, the station was formally renamed King's Cross St Pancras, except for the Metropolitan line station, which continued to use the old name until 16 October 1940, when it was also renamed. During this time, major rebuilding work took place, including a direct connection to St Pancras and a circular ticket hall. The main concourse opened on 18 June 1939, and the subway link to St Pancras opened two years later. The total cost of the work was £260,000.

The Metropolitan line platforms were closed between 16 October and 9 December 1940 due to bomb damage during the Blitz. (Note: The same bombing raid also destroyed the glass roof and signal box at St Pancras mainline station.) Further bomb damage to the Metropolitan line platforms occurred on 9 March 1941 when a train, the station roof, the signal box and the platforms were damaged and two railway staff were killed. New sub-surface platforms had been under construction as part of the station improvements begun in the 1930s and these were opened in an unfinished condition on 14 March 1941 250 m (270 yd) to the west. These were decorated with cream tiles featuring pale green edges. A subway was built between the sub-surface lines, running below Euston Road and joining with the tube lines, making interchanging between the various lines easier. The 1868 platforms later became King's Cross Thameslink station.

The Victoria line platforms were opened on 1 December 1968 as part of the line's second phase from Highbury & Islington to Warren Street. Unlike some other interchange stations on the line, it was not possible to put the platforms on the same level with other lines. (Note: Cross-platform interchanges were constructed between Victoria line platforms and those of other lines at Finsbury Park, Highbury & Islington, Euston and Oxford Circus.) Two new escalators were constructed, connecting the Northern / Piccadilly ticket hall with an expanded concourse. A further subway and staircase connected the new platforms to this.

The station was refurbished in 1986, in conjunction with several others on the tube network. The Northern and Piccadilly platforms were decorated with multi-coloured tiles featuring the letters "K" and "X" by the artist Paul Huxley. These tiles were removed during the substantial upgrade and expansion of the station in the mid 2000s.

=== Fire ===
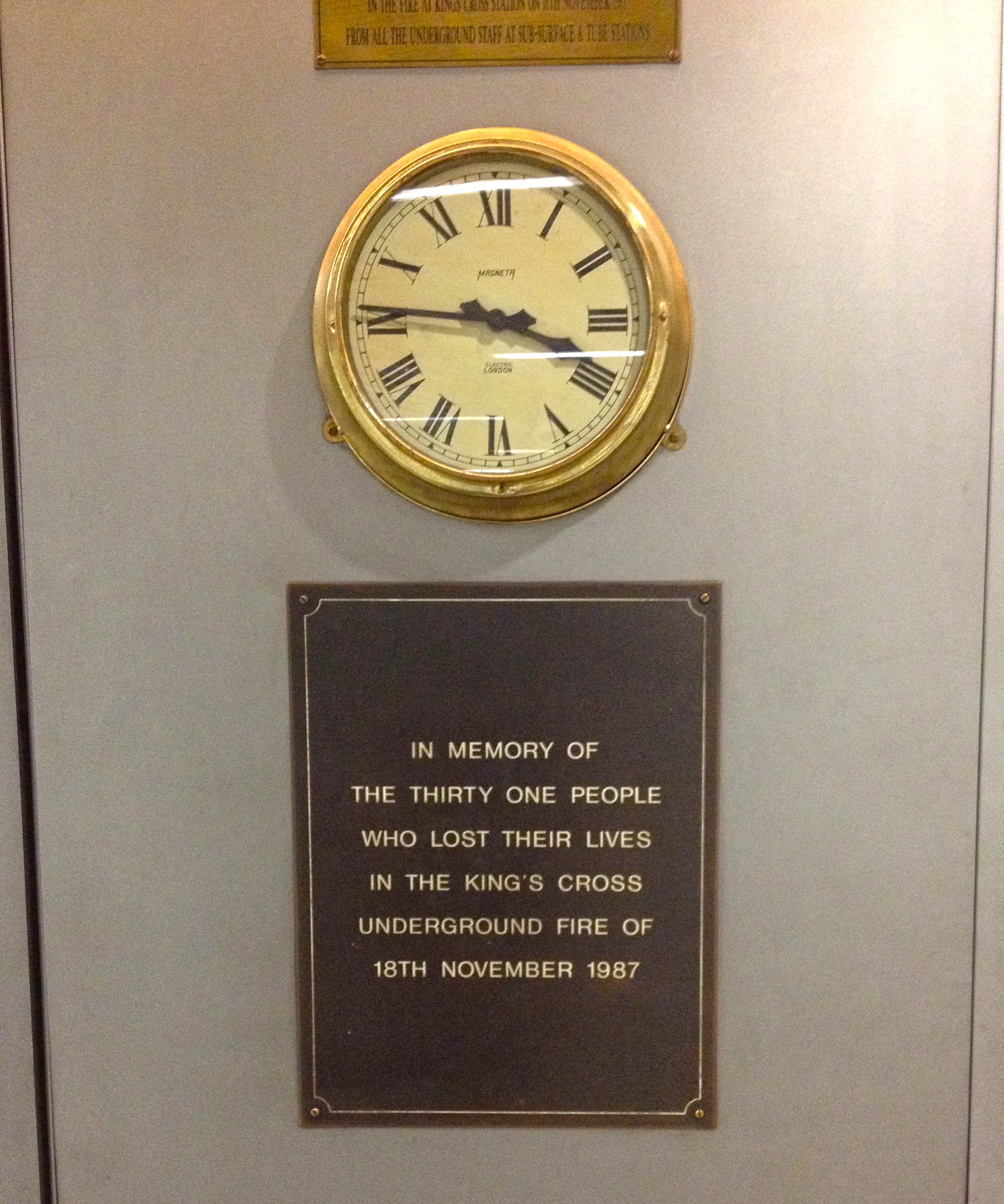
Memorial plaque with the clock to the 1987 fire in the station

The underground network had been at risk of fire since opening, and the limited amount of space and means of escape increased the possibility of fatalities. Following a serious fire at Finsbury Park in February 1976, staff had been trained to be alert for any possible causes of ignition or smouldering.

At around 7:30 p.m. on 18 November 1987, a passenger reported a small fire on the Northern / Piccadilly up escalator and alerted staff. The incident was judged as relatively minor, and the Fire Brigade arrived at 7:43 p.m. with four pumps and a ladder. By this time, the ticket hall had filled with smoke, trains passed through the station without stopping, and passengers were being evacuated. At around 7:45 p.m., a fireball erupted from the Northern / Piccadilly escalators and set the ticket hall ablaze. The fire burned for several hours and was not properly contained until around 1:46 a.m. the following morning. It killed 31 people, including a fire officer.

The fire is notable for resulting in the discovery of the then-unknown fire phenomenon of the trench effect made the fire develop upwards and finally caused it to explode into the station. As a result, fire safety procedures on the Underground were tightened, staff training was improved and wooden steps on escalators were replaced with metal ones. Smoking had already been banned on subsurface areas of the Underground in February 1985; following the King's Cross fire, it was banned throughout the entire network. The fire caused extensive damage, particularly to the old wooden escalators where it had started. Repairs and rebuilding took over a year; the Northern line platforms and the escalators from the ticket hall to the Piccadilly line remained closed until 5 March 1989.

=== Upgrade and expansion ===
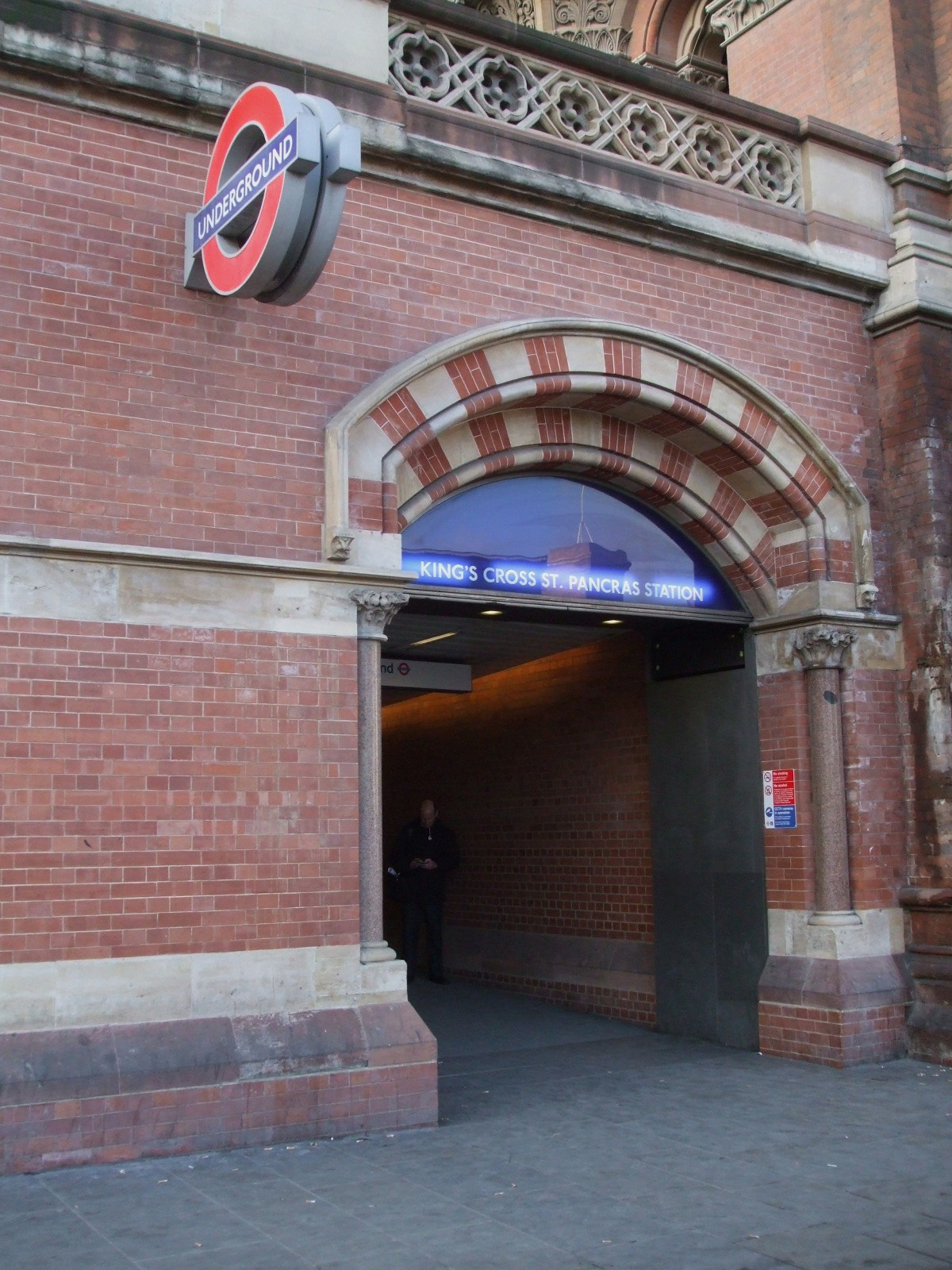
Northwest entrance to the Western ticket hall under St Pancras

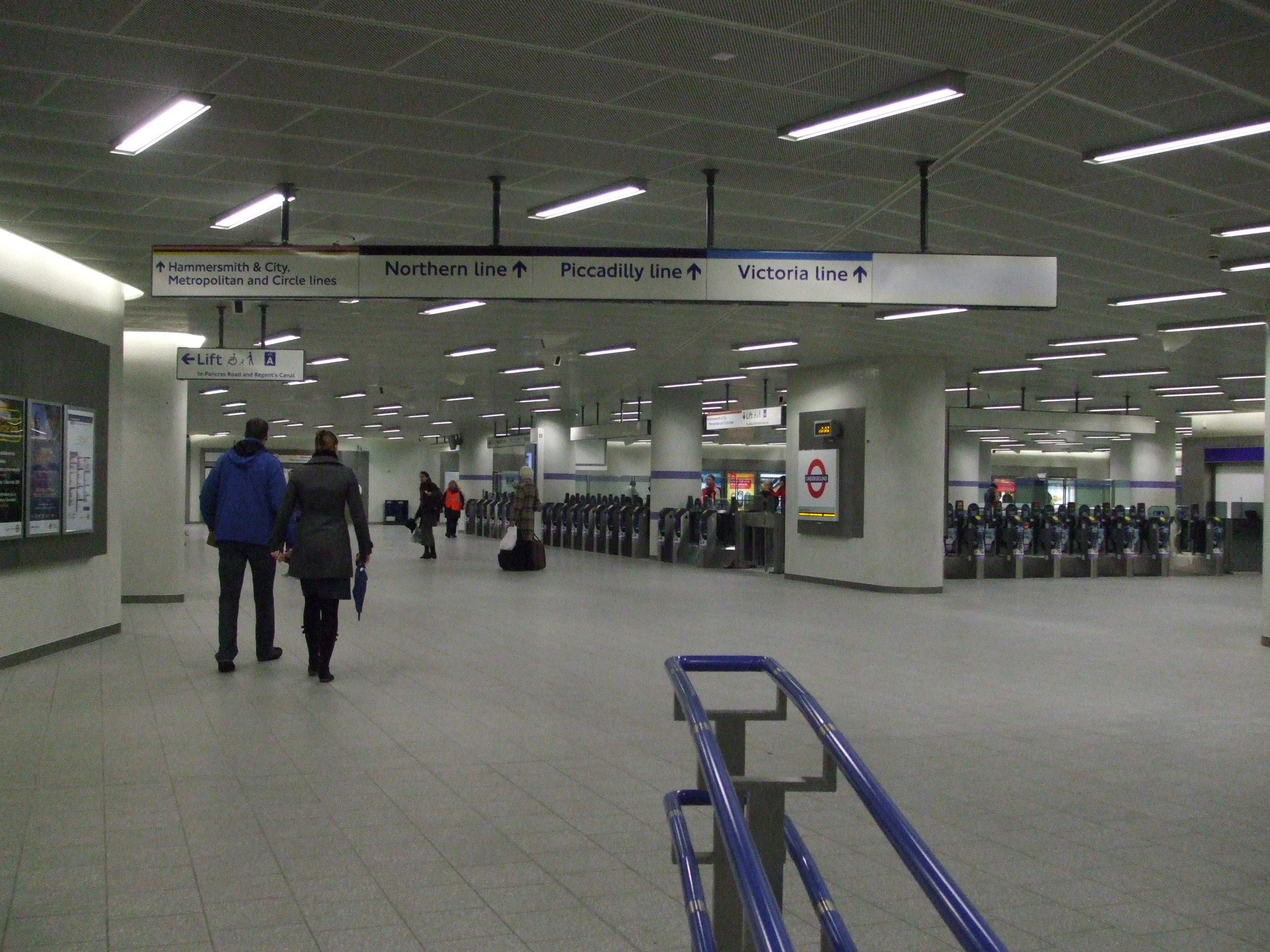
The Northern ticket hall, under the new King's Cross concourse, which opened in 2009

In the aftermath of the fire, the Fennell Report recommended that London Underground should investigate "passenger flow and congestion in stations and take remedial action". Consequently, a Parliamentary bill was tabled in 1993 to permit London Underground to improve and expand the congested station.

In August 2000, work began to upgrade and expand the station in conjunction with the Channel Tunnel Rail Link project, in which St Pancras would be the new terminal for Eurostar services to continental Europe. The upgrade took almost 10 years to complete at a cost of £810m, doubling the capacity of the station to more than 100,000 people daily. Two new ticket halls were built – the Western Ticket Hall under the forecourt of St Pancras station, and the Northern Ticket Hall under the new King's Cross station concourse. The existing ticket hall in front of King's Cross station was rebuilt and expanded. New passageways and escalators were provided to increase capacity, and ten new lifts were installed to make the station step-free. King's Cross Thameslink station closed on 9 December 2007 after the service moved to St Pancras.

On 26 May 2006, the first section of the project was completed, with the opening of the Western Ticket Hall underneath the forecourt of St Pancras station, providing access via the undercroft. On 29 November 2009, the station upgrade works were completed with the opening of the Northern Ticket Hall by the Mayor of London, Boris Johnson, and the Minister for London, Tessa Jowell. Jowell said that the improvements would be vital to help passenger movement during the London 2012 Olympics.

As of 2022, the tube map has begun referring to the station as King's Cross & St Pancras International.

== Ticket halls ==
Following completion of the station upgrade in 2010, King's Cross St Pancras has eleven entrances and four ticket halls.

- The "Tube Ticket Hall" in front of King's Cross station is signposted as the 'Euston Road' way out from the Tube lines. It was expanded as part of the station upgrade project.
- The "Pentonville Road" entrance was the former ticket hall for King's Cross Thameslink station. It has underground passageway connections to the Piccadilly and Victoria lines. The ticket hall has been closed to the public since March 2020.
- The "Western Ticket Hall" is under the forecourt of St Pancras station adjacent to Euston Road. It opened in 2009.
- The "Northern Ticket Hall" is west of King's Cross station under the concourse of the mainline station. It is signposted as the "Regent's Canal" exit. It opened in 2007.

== Artwork ==
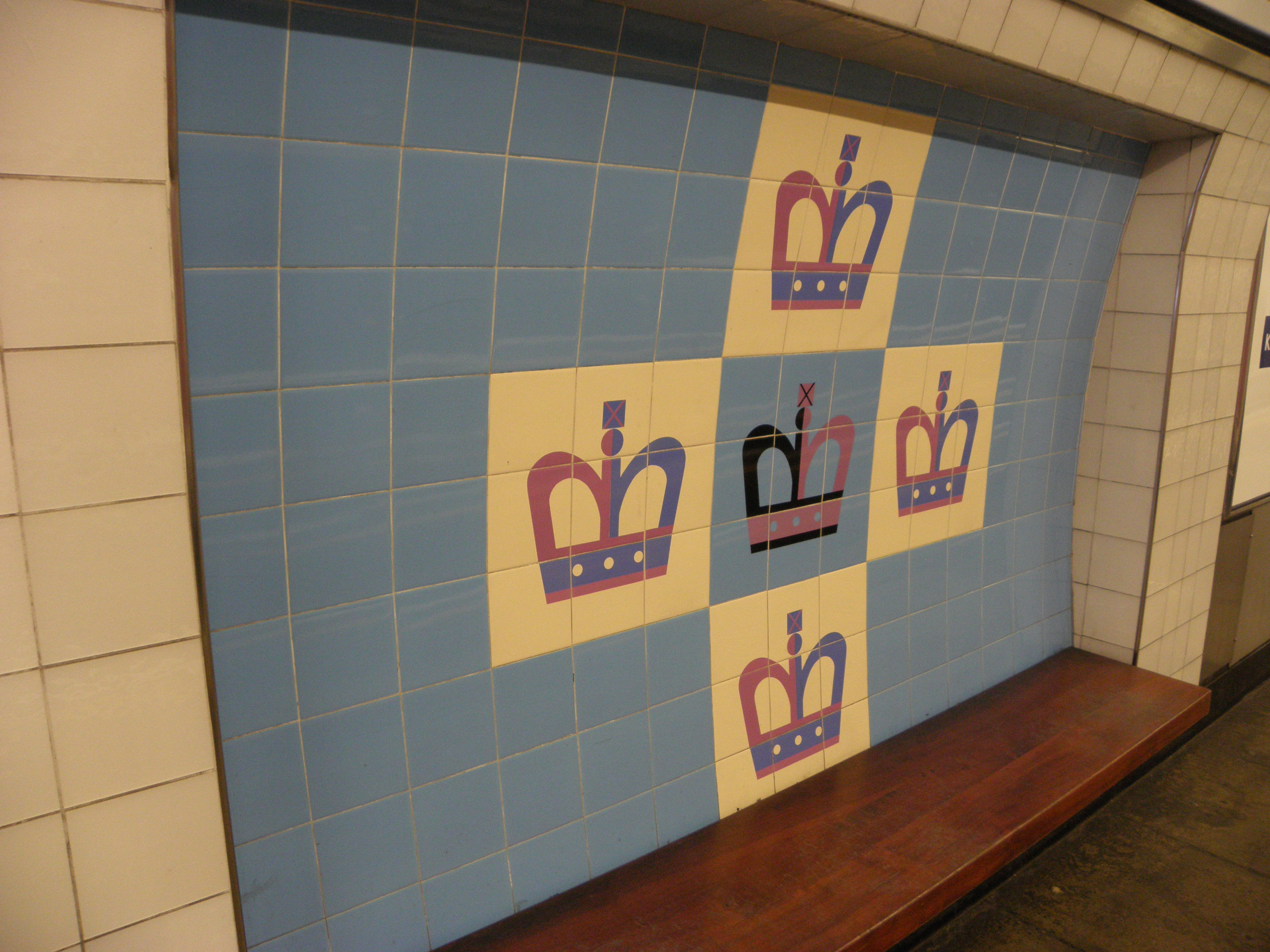
Tiled motif on the Victoria line platforms

The stations along the central part of the Piccadilly line, the Bakerloo line and some sections of the Northern line, were financed by the American entrepreneur Charles Tyson Yerkes, and known for the Leslie Green-designed red station buildings and distinctive platform tiling. Each station was designed with a unique tile pattern and colours.

Like other stations on the line, the Victoria line platforms at the station have a tiled motif in the seat recesses. The design by artist Tom Eckersley features a cross of crowns.

In the 2000s upgrade, Art on the Underground commissioned the first permanent artwork to be installed on the Underground since the 1980s. The stainless steel sculptures, Full Circle by artist Knut Henrik Henriksen, are located at the end of two new concourses on the Northern and Piccadilly lines.

== Future proposals ==
=== Crossrail 2 ===
In 1991, a route for a potential Chelsea-Hackney line was safeguarded through the area. This evolved into a proposed rail route based on Crossrail called Crossrail 2, which would link both Euston and King's Cross St Pancras, into the station Euston St Pancras. This proposed scheme would offer a second rail link between King's Cross and Victoria in addition to the Victoria line. In the 2007 safeguarded route, the next stations would be Tottenham Court Road and Angel. The scheme was shelved in 2020.

=== Docklands Light Railway extension from Bank ===
In 2011, strategy documents by Transport for London (TfL) and supported by the London Borough of Camden proposed an extension of the Docklands Light Railway (DLR) Bank branch to Euston and St Pancras to help relieve the Northern line between Euston and Bank, which would offer direct connections to Canary Wharf and London City Airport. TfL have considered a line from Bank via City Thameslink and Holborn to the two transport hubs but may not be developed until the full separation of the Northern line happens.

=== Piccadilly line ===
In 2005, a business case was prepared to re-open the disused York Road Underground station on the Piccadilly line, to serve the King's Cross Central development and help relieve congestion at King's Cross St Pancras. York Road station closed in September 1932 and was around 600 m (660 yd) north of King's Cross St Pancras.

== Services and layout ==
King's Cross St Pancras station is in London fare zone 1 and has eight platforms. In addition to the two mainline stations, the London Underground station is served by six lines. They are the Circle, Hammersmith & City, Metropolitan, Northern, Piccadilly and Victoria lines. On the Circle, Hammersmith & City and Metropolitan lines, the station is between Euston Square and Farringdon. On the Bank branch of the Northern line the station is between Euston and Angel, on the Piccadilly line it is between Russell Square and Caledonian Road, and on the Victoria line it is between Euston and Highbury & Islington. The Circle, Hammersmith & City and Metropolitan lines share the same pair of tracks at King's Cross, but the Northern, Piccadilly and Victoria lines each have their own platforms. In 2024, King's Cross St Pancras was the 2nd busiest station on the system, with 77.13 million passengers entering and exiting the station.

There is a siding north of the Victoria line platforms to enable trains from Brixton to terminate, turn around and head back south. Additionally, there is a scissors crossover to the west of the sub-surface lines platforms so trains heading eastbound can terminate there and use the scissors crossover to head back west and there is a crossover to the south of the Piccadilly line platforms.

Preceding station	London Underground	Following station
Euston Square towards Hammersmith	Circle line	Farringdon towards Edgware Road via Aldgate
Euston Square towards Hammersmith	Hammersmith & City line	Farringdon towards Barking
Euston Square towards Uxbridge, Amersham, Chesham or Watford	Metropolitan line	Farringdon towards Aldgate
Euston towards Edgware, Mill Hill East or High Barnet	Northern line Bank branch	Angel towards Morden
Russell Square towards Uxbridge, Rayners Lane or Heathrow Airport (Terminal 4 or Terminal 5)	Piccadilly line	Caledonian Road towards Cockfosters or Arnos Grove
Euston towards Brixton	Victoria line	Highbury & Islington towards Walthamstow Central
Proposed services
Russell Square towards Uxbridge, Rayners Lane or Heathrow Airport (Terminal 4 or Terminal 5)	Piccadilly line	York Road towards Cockfosters or Arnos Grove
Abandoned plans
Euston Square towards Hammersmith, Kensington (Addison Road), Uxbridge, Chesham, Verney Junction or Brill	Metropolitan line	Clerkenwell towards Whitechapel
Former services
Euston Square towards Hammersmith	Metropolitan line Hammersmith branch (1864–1990)	Farringdon towards Barking
Russell Square towards South Harrow	Piccadilly line (1906–1932)	York Road towards Finsbury Park

== Connections ==
Several London bus routes serve the station.

== Incidents ==
On 2 January 1885, an Irish Nationalist terrorist planted a bomb on the Metropolitan line just west of the station. There were no injuries and little damage as the bomb exploded in the tunnel rather than on any train. James Cunningham was arrested later that month and sentenced to life imprisonment with hard labour for causing the attack.

On 28 May 1959, the leading car on a Northern line train derailed just after leaving King's Cross St Pancras, heading for Euston. There were no injuries.

The 7 July 2005 London bombings were a series of co-ordinated bomb attacks, including an explosion in a Piccadilly line train travelling between King's Cross St Pancras and Russell Square which killed 26 people. The death toll was the highest of all the incidents, as the Piccadilly line is in a deep tube south of King's Cross and there was nowhere for the blast to escape.
