= York Road tube station =

Former London Underground station

York Road
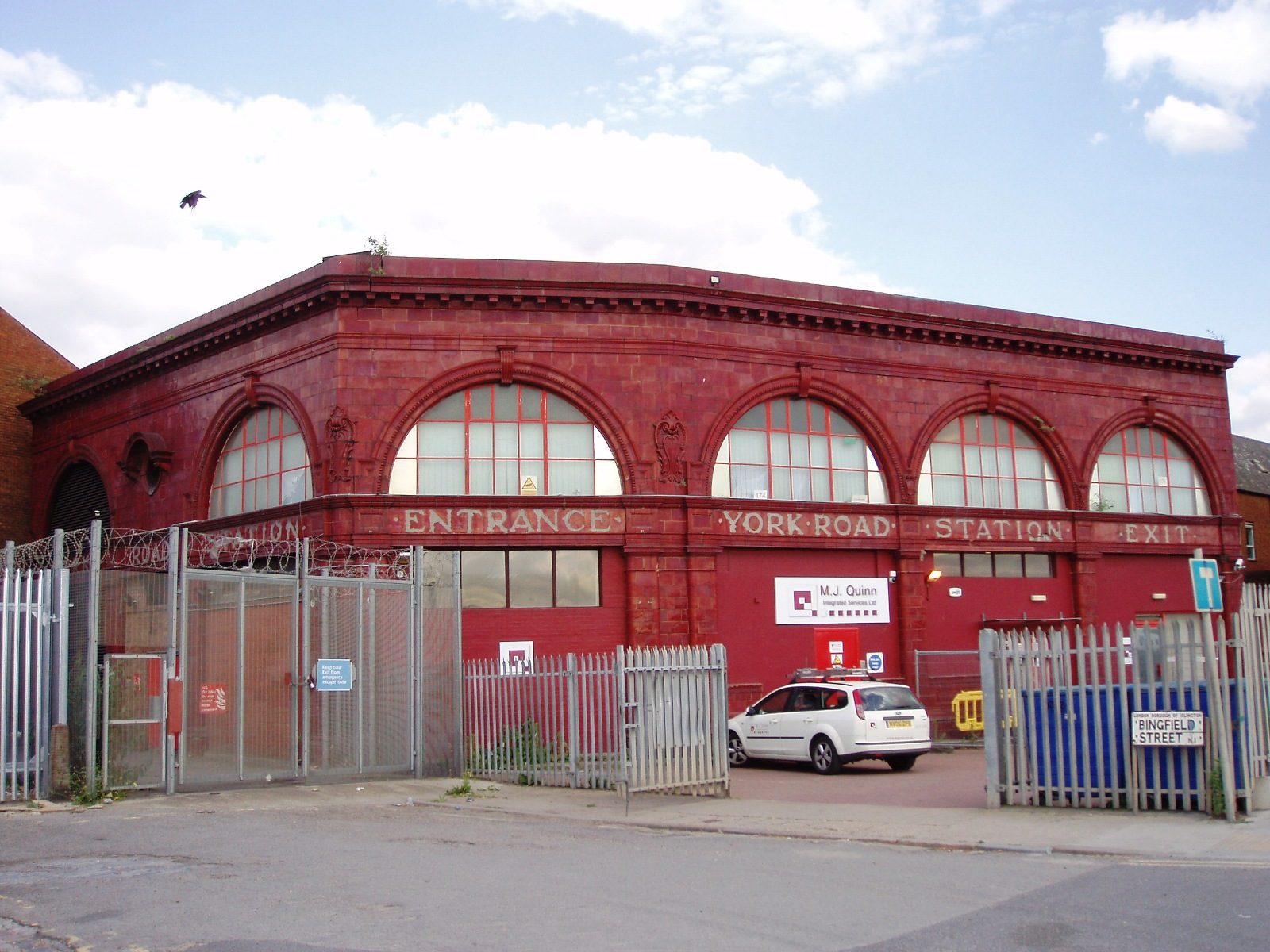
- York Road tube station in 2008
- Interactive map of York Road

General information
- Location: King's Cross
- Local authority: Metropolitan Borough of Islington
- Owner: Great Northern, Piccadilly and Brompton Railway
- Number of platforms: 2

Key dates
- 15 December 1906: Opened
- 19 September 1932: Closed

Other information
- Coordinates: 51°32′18″N 0°07′21″W

York Road is a disused station on the London Underground in Kings Cross, London, England, located between King's Cross St Pancras and Caledonian Road Piccadilly line stations, with its entrance at the corner of York Road (now York Way) and Bingfield Street.

It opened in 1906 and was one of the original stations on the Great Northern, Piccadilly and Brompton Railway (GNP&BR), the precursor to today's Piccadilly line. The surface buildings were constructed in the distinctive style of architect Leslie Green, and were connected to the platforms by a single lift shaft containing two lifts. Traffic levels were never high, and the station closed in 1932, on the same day that the northern extension of the Piccadilly Line from Finsbury Park to Arnos Grove opened.

London Transport Museum runs regular Zoom-hosted tours of the station through its "Hidden London" programme. The tour features original elements of the station including the tiled lift lobby and signal cabin and it explores the modifications that were made to the station over the years.

== Description ==
York Road station was located at the junction between York Road, which has since been renamed York Way, and Bingfield Street. The architect Leslie Green designed the building, which was similar to many of his designs, being finished in ruby-red glazed tiling supplied by the Leeds Fireclay Company. The contract for construction was awarded to Ford and Walton Limited (a company in which Robert Perks held a substantial interest), and the booking hall was at the surface level. It was linked to the platforms by a circular lift shaft, 23 feet (7.0 m) in diameter, which contained two electric lifts; there was also a staircase for emergency use. The lifts were manufactured by the Otis Elevator Company, and Colonel H A Yorke, who inspected the station at the time of its opening on behalf of the Board of Trade, recorded that they rose 89.49 feet (27.28 m) from the platform level to the booking hall level.

Unlike most other Great Northern, Piccadilly & Brompton Railway stations, where the lifts stopped at a mezzanine level a little above the platforms, and required passengers to descend a final flight of stairs to reach the trains, the lifts at York Road descended directly to platform level. This meant that the platforms were further apart, and the interconnecting passages were longer as a result. The eastbound platform was 350 feet (110 m) long, while the westbound platform was slightly longer. The platform layout was almost identical to that at Caledonian Road, but the two tracks curved outwards in the middle of the station to accommodate the extra width of the lift shaft bases. It did mean, however, that the station was accessible right from when it first opened.

The platform tiling was carried out by George Woolliscroft & Son of Hanley, Staffordshire, and was made up of white with maroon and brick red patterning. Most of the tiling has since been painted over in grey, but a small section remains untouched and can be seen at the Finsbury Park end of the former eastbound platform. The station was ventilated by a fan, which drew air out of the station at a rate of 18,500 cubic feet (520 m^{3}) per minute.

A small signalling cabin stands near the unpainted tiling, and was used to operate a crossover immediately to the northeast of the station. This signal box remained operational until 25 April 1964, although by that time the crossover was little used, having been largely superseded by a new one commissioned at King's Cross on 25 November 1956. However, the disused cabin still stands and can be seen from passing trains.

Being sited in a poor industrial area, the station saw little use, and from October 1909, some trains did not stop at the platforms, in order to improve service times to the other stations. The Sunday services were withdrawn entirely from 5 May 1918. The station remained open for weekday and Saturday traffic only, and closed on 4 May 1926, when the general strike began. Although the strike only lasted for nine days, the station remained closed. However the subject of its closure was eventually raised in the House of Commons, and it reopened in October 1926, but the reprieve was short-lived, lasting until 19 September 1932 when it was permanently closed. The closure occurred on the same day as the northern extension of the Piccadilly Line from Finsbury Park to Arnos Grove opened.

The surface station buildings are still clearly visible, on the left heading south down York Way towards King's Cross. They were used by the Victor Printing Company following closure, but eventually became derelict. They were refurbished in 1989, when the removal of boards covering the facade enabled the original lettering to be seen once again. The former platform area below is also visible from passing trains in both directions, although part of the eastbound platform is bricked off. As with most other disused Underground stations, the platform itself has been removed. As the site is currently used as an emergency exit from the tunnels, one of the passageways between the platforms is permanently lit by a series of lamps.

== Proposed reopening ==
One of London's largest redevelopment projects, King's Cross Central, began construction in 2008 across the road from the station. Islington council and Transport for London (TfL) commissioned a study in 2005 to consider the possible reopening of the station. At the same time, however, it was recognised that other transport priorities reduced the likelihood of such a project moving forward in the near future. The site would need extensive overhauls to bring the station up to modern day standards, at a cost estimated at £21 million in 2005. Local political groups have been keen to see the station reopened in order to reduce passenger congestion at King's Cross St. Pancras and to encourage development in the surrounding community. The Liberal Democrats advocated the reopening of the station in their 2006 local election manifesto, and at least one candidate for the Conservative Party similarly campaigned for the station to be reopened.

In June 2017, the council and Transport for London were reportedly discussing the possible reopening of Maiden Lane overground and York Road underground stations. The reopening of Maiden Lane was considered to be more likely, as York Road is quite close to King's Cross St Pancras, and the new station would increase journey times on the Piccadilly line.

| Preceding station | London Underground | Following station |
|---|---|---|
| King's Cross St Pancras towards South Harrow | Piccadilly line | Caledonian Road towards Finsbury Park |
