= List of fictional rapid transit stations =

There are many instances in popular culture in which fictional underground stations appear. In many cases for film or television, actual stations are used for the purpose of filming.

== Fictional London Underground stations ==
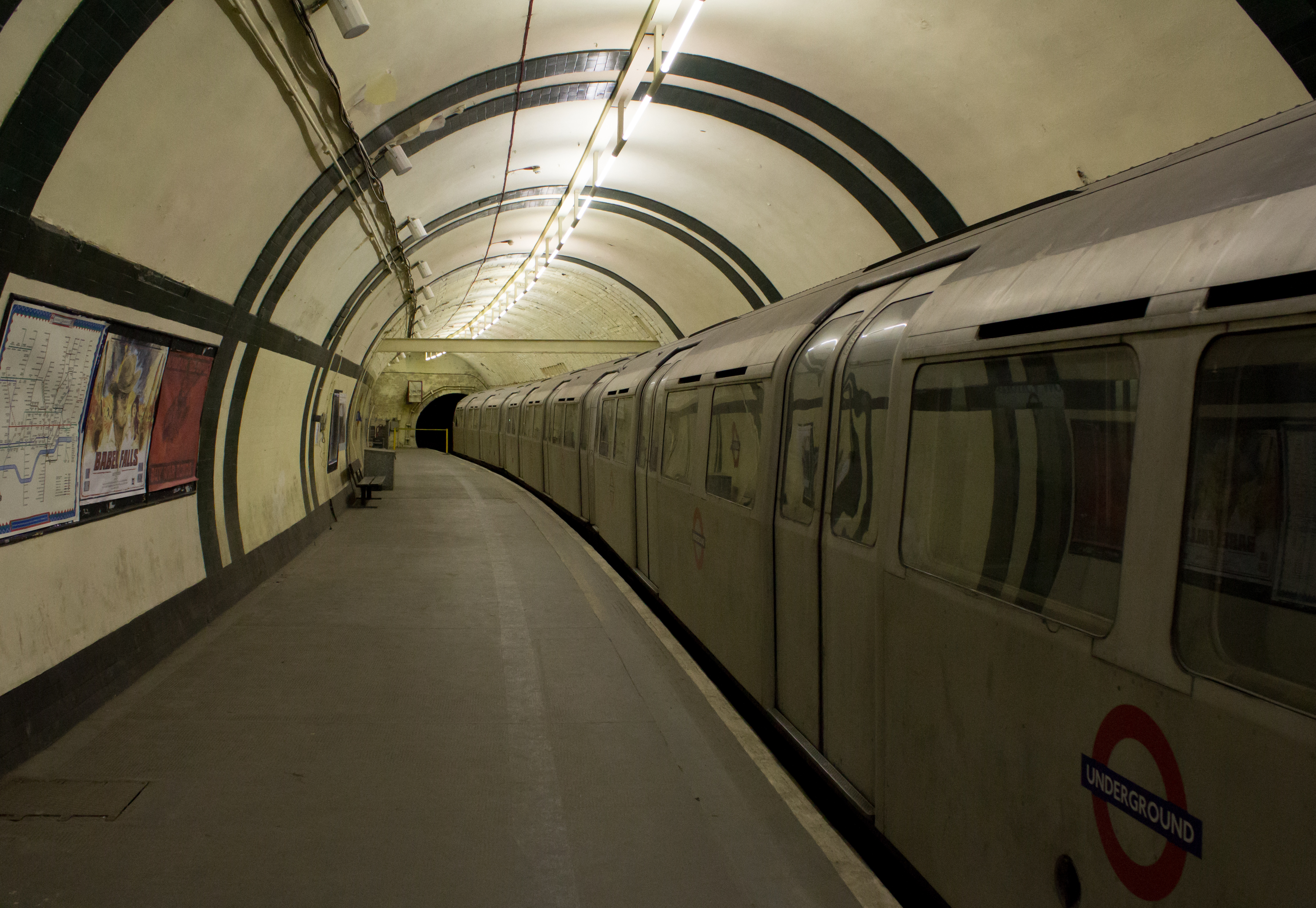
Many London Underground settings in film have been shot at the disused Aldwych in London

- Bankside – 2020 video game Watch Dogs: Legion.
- Belgravia – 1960 film Piccadilly Third Stop.
- Blackwall – featured in the TV drama series London's Burning.
- Bloomsbury – 1934 film Bulldog Jack.
  The film features a chase/fight scene in a disused Bloomsbury station on the Central line, connected to the British Museum by a secret tunnel. A map is seen on the wall of the train in the climax scene, involving a race through the tunnels on a runway tube train. The map lists the stations between Ealing Broadway and Liverpool Street from top to bottom, and includes "Bloomsbury", between the now-closed British Museum and Chancery Lane, in place of Holborn, as well as a fictional High Holborn station located in-between Chancery Lane and Post Office (now St Paul's). In an absence of continuity, the map later changes to another, where the order is reversed, with Liverpool Street at the top and, "Western Avenue" is at the bottom. This different map includes a number of fictional stations in place of the real station names. It now reads: Liverpool Street, Bank, Post Office (now St Paul's), Holborn, Bloomsbury, New Oxford Street, Langham (presumably a reference to Langham Place near Oxford Circus), Cavendish Street, Cumberland (presumably a reference to the Cumberland Gate of Hyde Park), Gloucester Gate, Campden Hill, Kensington Park, Holland Road, White City (which was yet to be built in 1935), North Perivale, East Perivale, and Western Avenue, where the chase terminates. The station names at the end of this fictional version of the Central line reflect the locations of some of the stations that would later form the extension of the Central line towards West Ruislip. Bloomsbury was the initial name considered for British Museum station but was dropped before the station opened.
- Brewer Street – 2020 video game Watch Dogs: Legion.
- Camden Road – Appeared in the film The Gentle Gunman; footage later reused in the 1969 ITV television programme Strange Report.
- Charnham – TV soap Family Affairs.
- Constitution Hill – 2004 Time Hunter novella The Tunnel at the End of the Light.
- Crouch End – 2004 film Shaun of the Dead featured a deleted scene (included on the DVD).
  The title character (played by Simon Pegg) attempted to catch a tube to work from the station only to find it closed. A special 'Crouch End' tube station sign was made for the film scene and, according to Pegg's DVD commentary, is now mounted in his own bedroom. Under an abandoned part of the Underground's 1930s Northern Heights plan the real life Crouch End main line station would have transferred to the Northern line. The station closed in 1954 without the transfer taking place (see also: List of former and unopened London Underground stations).
- Duchess Street – featured in the 1932 Jack Hulbert film Love on Wheels.
- Embassy – 2020 video game Watch Dogs: Legion.
- Ginners Park – station used as a shelter in an air raid in the 1942 film Unpublished Story starring Richard Greene and Valerie Hobson.
- Grays Inn – Portrayed as a deep level Piccadilly line station, in the series 5 episode (Tubes help you breed less easily) of the British T.V. sitcom, Shelley. Broadcast, 2nd December 1982.
- Haggerston – Appeared as an abandoned, sub-surface station in The New Statesman episode, "Waste Not Want Not".
  It should not be confused with the real Haggerston railway station in East London. This station is on an elevated section of the London Overground; it re-opened in 2010, but was disused when the programme was made.
- Hanover Street – 1979 film Hanover Street, starring Harrison Ford.

Hayne Street tube station on the studio tram tour at Walt Disney Studios, Disneyland Resort Paris

- Hayne Street – Mock-up found in the Disneyland Paris Disney Studios "Studio Tram Tour" inspired by the film Reign of Fire (2002); the film did not include a completed/named station.
- Hickory Road – in Hickory Dickory Dock, Agatha Christie novel.
  Hickory Dickory Dock, one of Agatha Christie's detective stories featuring Hercule Poirot, is set in Hickory Road in London. A version of the story was made by Carnival Films for London Weekend Television's "Poirot" series. First broadcast in February 1995, the start of the programme sees the main characters alighting from an Underground train and exiting from Hickory Road station. The climax of the programme also involves a chase around the fictional station.
- High Street – 1954 film The Good Die Young with Laurence Harvey. Locations in Barbican/Farringdon area.
- Hobbs End – 1967 film Quatermass and the Pit.
  Featured a tube station called Hobbs End. The station is located at the end of the non-existent 'Hobbs Lane'. One shot shows a new street nameplate reading "Hobbs Lane", and indicating it as being in the W10 postal district. Next to it a much older nameplate reading "Hob's Lane". Hob is an old name for the Devil. The name Hobbs End has more recently been used by London Underground as one of the stations on The Model Railway training simulator at the West Ashfield Underground station training facility. John Carpenter's 1994 horror film In the Mouth of Madness pays tribute to the Quatermass movie by naming the fictional town that is central to the story Hobb's End, New Hampshire.
- Lambeth – 2020 video game Watch Dogs: Legion.
- Lewisham, Ladywell, Edge of the World and Catford – in an episode of the LWT comedy series End of Part One
  The main characters watch a film called "The Life of Christopher Columbus". In the film, Columbus goes to a tube station and asks for a train to America but is told he can go only as far as Catford. Part of a modified tube map is shown which shows the fictitious tube stations Lewisham, Ladywell, Edge of the World and Catford on the East London Section of the Metropolitan line south from New Cross station. There is an actual part of the mainline Mid-Kent Railway that interchanges with New Cross station, and the stations are, southwards in order: St. John's, Lewisham, Ladywell and Catford Bridge (Catford on a different line interchanges with the latter).
- Marble Hill – seen at the beginning of the 1991 Poirot: Wasps' Nest, adapted from the novel by Agatha Christie. In reality, Arnos Grove Underground station was used as the location.
- Museum – 1972 film Death Line.
  Unlike the real British Museum station, in the film this is an unfinished station that was being built by the City and South London Railway (now the Bank/Morden branch of the Northern line) before the tunnel collapsed and it was abandoned.
- Norbidge – 2022 drama-thriller series Inside Man.
- North Atwood – 2011 video game Uncharted 3: Drake's Deception.
- Old Kent Road – 2020 video game Watch Dogs: Legion.
- Park Street – 1948 film The Passionate Friends.
- Riverside – 2020 video game Watch Dogs: Legion.
- Queen's Arcade – Doctor Who episode Rose.
- Rumbaloo Line – Tube line in Joan Aiken's children's book, Arabel's Raven.
- Scratch Row – an abandoned tube station in Wireless Theatre's Victorian-set fantasy-adventure audio series, The Springheel Saga.
- Sumatra Road – featured in "The Empty Hearse," the first episode of the third series of the British TV crime drama Sherlock.
  The station's name is an allusion to "The Giant Rat of Sumatra", mentioned in the original Sherlock Holmes stories. It is fictionally located between Westminster and St. James's Park, underneath the Houses of Parliament. In the story, the station was partially constructed but never opened, being similar to North End. The scenes were shot at Aldwych Underground station.
- Sun Hill – Long-running ITV police drama, The Bill.

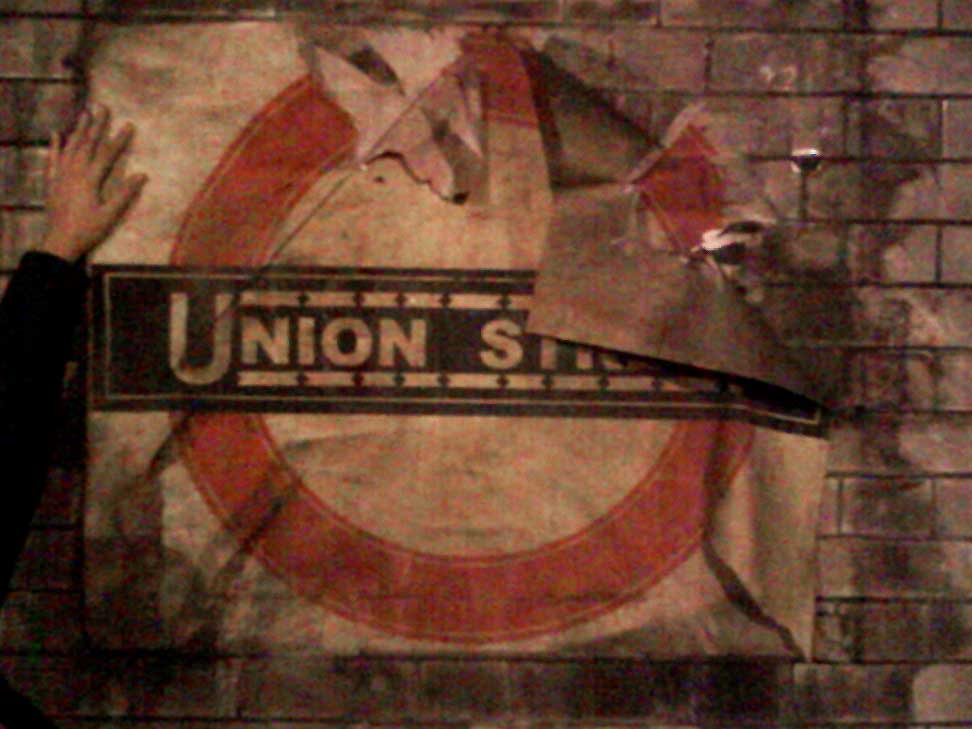
Station roundel prop of Union Street, in situ at Holborn tramway station

- Tidis – 2020 video game Watch Dogs: Legion.
- Trafalgar Square – 2025 film Mission: Impossible – The Final Reckoning.
  The film depicts a tube station with entrances outside the National Gallery in Trafalgar Square. The square is served in reality by Charing Cross tube station, whose Bakerloo line platforms were separate and formerly known as Trafalgar Square.
- Union Street – featured in the 2008 film The Escapist and filmed on location in Holborn tramway station. Altered versions of Harry Beck's 1941 map were produced for the film, showing the station located between Borough and Elephant & Castle, close to the position of London's real Union Street.

Vauxhall Cross, the fictional Tube station featured in James Bond films

- Vauxhall Cross – 2002 James Bond film Die Another Day.
  A supposed closed station on a disused branch of the Piccadilly line (similar to Aldwych) that runs south of the river to Vauxhall Cross, in the vicinity of the MI6 building. In fact, the Piccadilly line does not cross the river at all, although Vauxhall on the Victoria line is within about 100 metres.
- Viaduct – 2020 video game Watch Dogs: Legion.
- Walford East – BBC TV soap Eastenders.
  The BBC soap opera EastEnders created Walford East Underground station, which replaces Bromley-by-Bow on the EastEnders tube map, to allow the locals to escape "up West" for a night out. Neither Walford nor the tube station exists – except on the EastEnders set. Most of the platform and train shots are filmed at East Finchley. A station at Walford West has also been referenced by characters in the show.
- Walworth Road – 2020 video game Watch Dogs: Legion.
- Wells Lane – BBC Spooks Series 5 Episode 7
  An episode of the BBC series Spooks (broadcast 23 October 2006) featured a fictional disused Underground station called Wells Lane.
- West Ashfield – see West Ashfield Underground station.
- Westbourne Oak – in the 2014 film Paddington. Presumably a reference to both Royal Oak and Westbourne Park; the actual filming location was Maida Vale station.
- Wickerswood – 1936 film Man in the Mirror featuring Alastair Sim.
- Winchester – The book Doctor Who: Invasion of the Dinosaurs.
- World's End – 1964 BBC Doctor Who episode "The Dalek Invasion of Earth".

== Fictional Glasgow Subway stations ==
- Shieldinch – BBC Scotland soap River City.

== Fictional Chicago "L" stations ==
- Balbo – The Fugitive (filmed at the 203 North LaSalle Street entrance to the Clark & Lake L station).
- Main St. – Shake It Up! (undetermined location but evidently within the city limits, unlike the real Main L station which is located in Evanston, Illinois).

== Fictional Manchester Metrolink stations ==
- Weatherfield North tram stop – introduced into the Granada Television soap opera Coronation Street in 2018.

== Fictional New York City Subway stations ==
- Lafayette Street – In Knowing, a major collision occurs between a 6 and a 4 train at Lafayette Street station. The front entrance sign says that Lafayette is served by the 4, 5, 6, J/Z, and M trains, making the real station either Canal Street or Brooklyn Bridge – City Hall (M trains still run on Nassau Street Line at this time). The driver's announcement that Spring Street was the next station makes it possible that it could have been Bleecker Street, which in turn is known as Broadway-Lafayette Street on the IND Sixth Avenue Line, where there is an in-station transfer (then only for southbound 6 trains).
- Morningside – an upper Manhattan subway stop from the pilot episode of CBS's NYC 22.
- Roscoe Street – a stop from the opening levels of Max Payne. Served by the 2, 4, and 5 trains, it may be inspired by the 149th Street-Grand Concourse station.
- Kings Plaza – a subway stop in Brooklyn at the end of the V train. The V train however at no point ever had any exclusive stations, sharing all of its stations with the E, F, or R trains, and not going to Brooklyn, except for a brief unexpected extension to Euclid Avenue in January 2005 after a signal room fire at Chambers Street.

For the filming of Morbius (2022), an NYC-Subway styled station signage with its name "Front Street" served by the 2, 3, A, and C trains, similar to the Chambers Street/Park Place station complex or Fulton Street, was placed in the disused Jubilee line section at Charing Cross station on the London Underground. Similar signs were placed on buildings in the Northern Quarter of Manchester. The film also incorrectly depicts the New York Subway running on a fourth rail the way the London Underground does.

== Fictional Washington, D.C. Metro stations ==
- Cathedral Heights – The second season premiere of Netflix's House of Cards features a scene inside the Cathedral Heights station of the Washington Metro. Cathedral Heights is a real D.C. neighborhood, but there is no Cathedral Heights station; the closest Metro stations to the neighborhood are Tenleytown-American University station to the north and Cleveland Park station to the east.
- Farragut – The first season of Showtime's Homeland contains a scene outside of D.C.'s Farragut station, portrayed as a Metro stop on the red and orange lines. In fact, there is no Farragut Station. There is a Farragut North station, on the red line, and a Farragut West station, on the orange, blue, and silver lines. The scene was filmed in Charlotte, North Carolina.
- Georgetown – In No Way Out, a chase scene is depicted as passing through a Georgetown station in the Washington Metro. There is no Georgetown station; the nearest Metro station to Georgetown is Foggy Bottom. The interior of the station depicted in the movie was in the Baltimore Metro Subway and not Washington's.
- Pyron – In The Walking Dead Season 11 (Episode 1), characters working their way towards another settlement seek refuge from a storm and continue passage through a Metro station on the yellow line. Negan directs the group that to get to Bethesda, they should "...take the Yellow line north and switch to Blue at Ronald Reagan National Airport Station, then on to the Red to Bethesda."

== Stations in fictional countries ==
- Lollipop Park Estates – In Adventure Time Season 5 (episode 43) "Root Beer Guy", station of Candy Kingdom Subway in the Candy Kingdom

== See also ==
- List of fictional railway stations
