= West End of London =

District of Central London, England

Coordinates: 51°30′47″N 0°07′30″W

West End of London: London’s West End
- Entertainment district, central business district
- Location within Greater London
- London borough: Camden; Westminster
- Ceremonial county: Greater London
- Region: London
- Country: England
- Sovereign state: United Kingdom
- Post town: LONDON
- Postcode district: W1
- Postcode district: WC1, WC2
- Dialling code: 020
- Police: Metropolitan
- Fire: London
- Ambulance: London
- UK Parliament: Cities of London and Westminster; Holborn and St Pancras
- London Assembly: Barnet and Camden; West Central

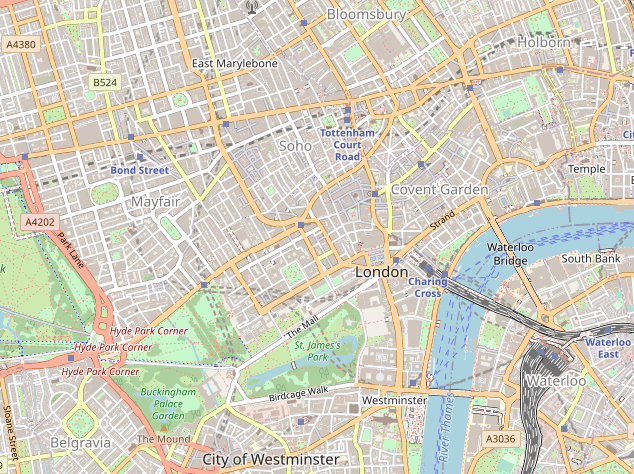
London's West End and immediate vicinity

The West End of London (commonly referred to as the West End) is a district of London, England. It is west of the City of London and north of the River Thames, in the London Borough of Camden and the City of Westminster.

It is where many of the city's major tourist attractions, shops, businesses, government buildings and entertainment venues, including West End theatres, are concentrated. The term "West End" is used internationally as a metonym for London's theatre district and associated performing arts scene – just as "Broadway" is used to describe that of New York City.

While the City of London is the main financial district in London, the West End is the main commercial and entertainment centre of the city. It is the largest central business district in the United Kingdom. It is one of the most expensive locations in the world in which to rent commercial and office space.

== History ==
The two main focusses of development and activity in medieval London were the walled City of London, the capital's ancient core, and Westminster to the west. The modern West End is very closely associated with Westminster, and largely contained within it. The term 'West End' became commonplace in the early 19th century, being used infrequently before then.

Lying to the west of the historic Roman and medieval City of London, Westminster and neighbouring areas were long favoured by the rich elite as a place of residence, because it was close to the seat of royal power at the Palace of Westminster (now home to parliament) and usually upwind of the smoke drifting from the crowded City.

The Cities of London and Westminster had their own distinct character and separate legal identity (for example, the City of London has its own police force and is a distinct county). The City of London became a centre for the banking, financial, legal and professional sectors, while Westminster became associated with the leisure, shopping, commerce, and entertainment sectors, the government, and home to universities, museums and embassies.

=== Roman London and Lundenwic ===
London's ancient core, the walled city of London, was established by the Romans at the lowest possible bridging point of the River Thames. A suburb grew up, south of London Bridge in Southwark, but there was no known western suburb, or any other suburbs north of the river. The city was abandoned after the Romans left Britain in around 410.

There was very little Anglo-saxon activity within the walls during the 7th and 8th centuries, but they did establish a major trading settlement called Lundenwic to the west of the ruined city. This settlement stretched from Temple in the east to Leicester Square in the west. Lundenwic declined and was eventually abandoned in the early ninth century as a result of Viking raids. In the late 9th century Alfred the Great re-occupied the Roman city, repairing its historic defensive walls. The main focus of activity would be the western half of the city, the city being formed of two hills; Ludgate Hill in the west (topped by St Pauls Cathedral) and Cornhill in the east, the two being separated by the River Walbrook.

=== 12th and 13th centuries ===
The large and prosperous extramural City ward of Farringdon Without, extensively urbanised during the 12th century, has been described as London's First West End. Large high status residences were built along the Strand, the route between Ludgate and Westminster, the most opulent of these was the Savoy Palace built in the mid 13th century. In 1381, during the Peasant's Revolt, it was in the hand's of the unpopular John of Gaunt who was effectively the head of King's government. The rebels systematically destroyed the Palace.

=== Stuart period ===
James I wished to beautify London, and one of his early schemes to that end was the paving of West Smithfield. To help achieve this aim, he continued Elizabeth I's policy of restricting the physical growth of London. James however, was short of funds and in 1609 granted the Earl of Salisbury permission to develop his land around St Martin's Lane, in exchange for contribution to the exchequer.

In 1630, his son Charles I was also short of money and granted the Earl of Bedford permission to develop the site of a former female monastery at Covent Garden in Westminster. Charles sought to balance the interests of the developer with the community. In exchange for permission to develop the land, Bedford was required to pave and maintain nearby Long Acre, and donate £2000 to the exchequer. The permission came with the condition that the development included a square and church and be designed by Inigo Jones.

In 1638 the builder William Newton bought land west of Lincoln's Inn with the intention, much to dismay of local people angry at the loss their open spaces for Newton's private gain. King Charles allowed development on condition that a portion of the fields be retained to "frustrate the covetous and greedy endeavours of such persons as persons as daily seek to fill that small remainder of air in those parts with unnecessary and unprofitable buildings". The selection of Inigo Jones also assured a high quality development.

The Great Fire of London did not directly affect the West End a great deal, but the huge loss of housing in the City of London led to a building boom in the west.

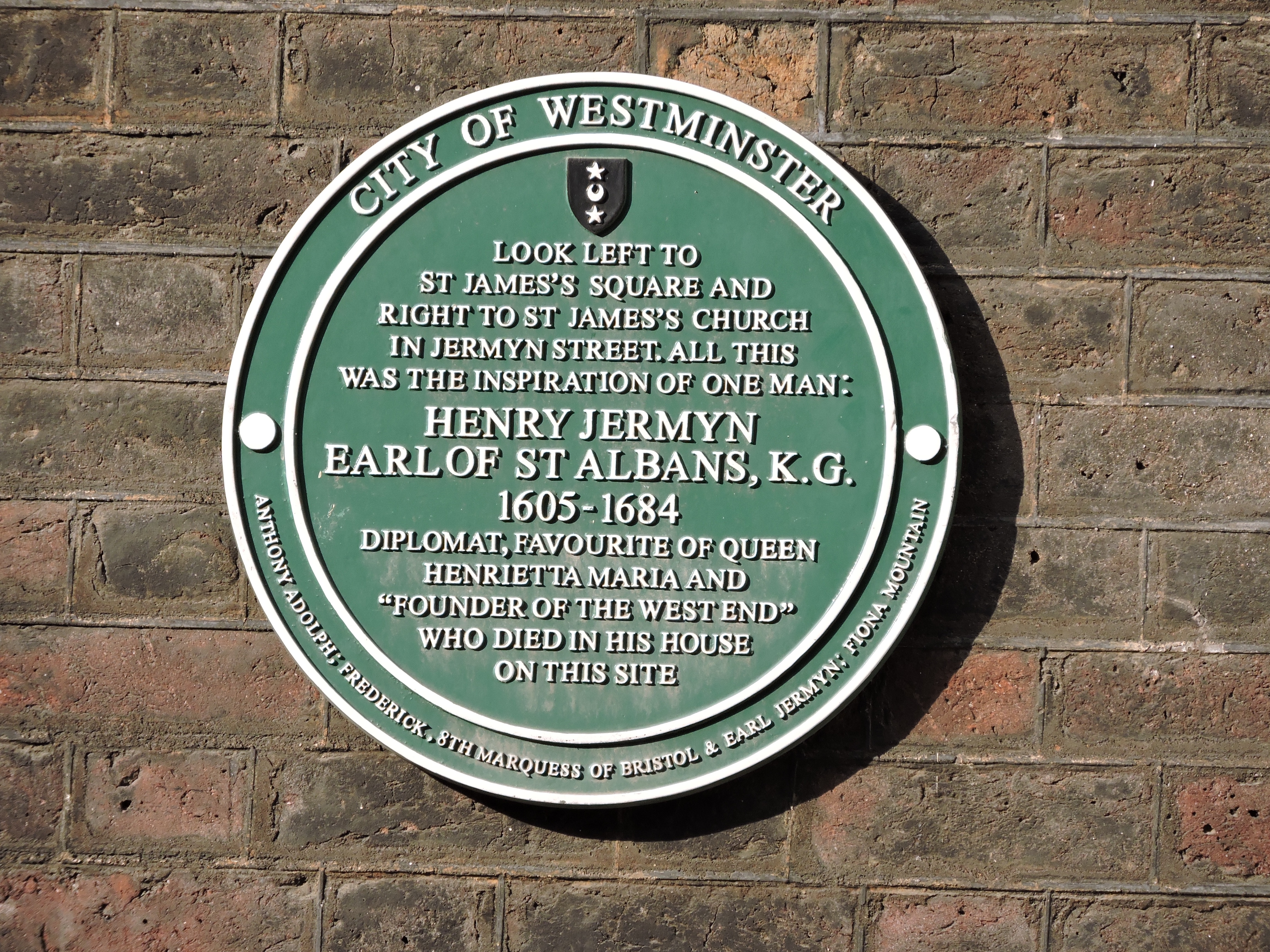
Plaque commemorating Henry Jermyn's role in developing the West End. Located at Duke of York Street, St James's, Westminster.

Beginning his work just before the Great Fire, Henry Jermyn, was instrumental in developing the St James's and Mayfair districts of Westminster. These districts provided a fashionable new focus for western London. Jermyn would become known as the Father of the West End.

Although most of the West End was built as a series of palaces, expensive town houses, fashionable shops and places of entertainment, the areas closest to the City, around Holborn, St Giles, and Covent Garden contained poorer communities, until they were cleared and redeveloped in the 19th century.

=== 19th century ===
In the 19th century much of central London was demolished to make way for new railway termini and their approaches. The West End avoided the worse of this with the major stations (Charing Cross, Marylebone, Paddington and Victoria) located on the periphery of the area.

=== 20th century ===
The 20th century saw the steep decline of elite residential life in the West End, and the loss of a large number of notable structures due to wartime bombing and planning decisions.

== Boundaries and administration ==
As the West End is a term used colloquially by Londoners and is not an official geographical or municipal definition, it is debatable which parts of inner West London should be included. Broadly speaking it includes parts of the City of Westminster and the southern fringe of the London Borough of Camden.

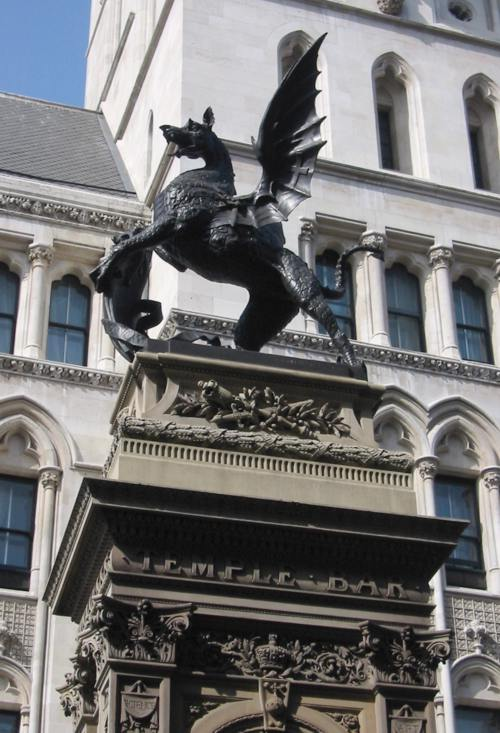
Dragon statue on the Temple Bar monument, which marks the boundary between the City of Westminster and City of London

=== Core areas ===
The core areas of the West End are mainly contained within Westminster, the part of the larger modern City of Westminster south of Oxford Street, which originated as a Roman Road.

Defining core areas of the West End depends on the land use. The original focus of elite housing and private members clubs was bounded by Oxford Street to the north, Hyde Park and Green Park to the west, St James Park to the south and by Regent Street and Waterloo Place in the east. An area taking in the Mayfair and St James's areas of Westminster.

The core shopping area is a little to the east, around the shopping streets of Oxford Street in the north, with Bond Street and Regent Street heading south from it, taking in parts of the Mayfair and Soho areas of Westminster.

London Theatreland is further east again, bounded by Oxford Street in the north, Regent Street in the west, the Strand in the south and Kingsway in the east. This area takes in parts of Westminster such as Soho and Covent Garden and part of St Giles in the London Borough of Camden.

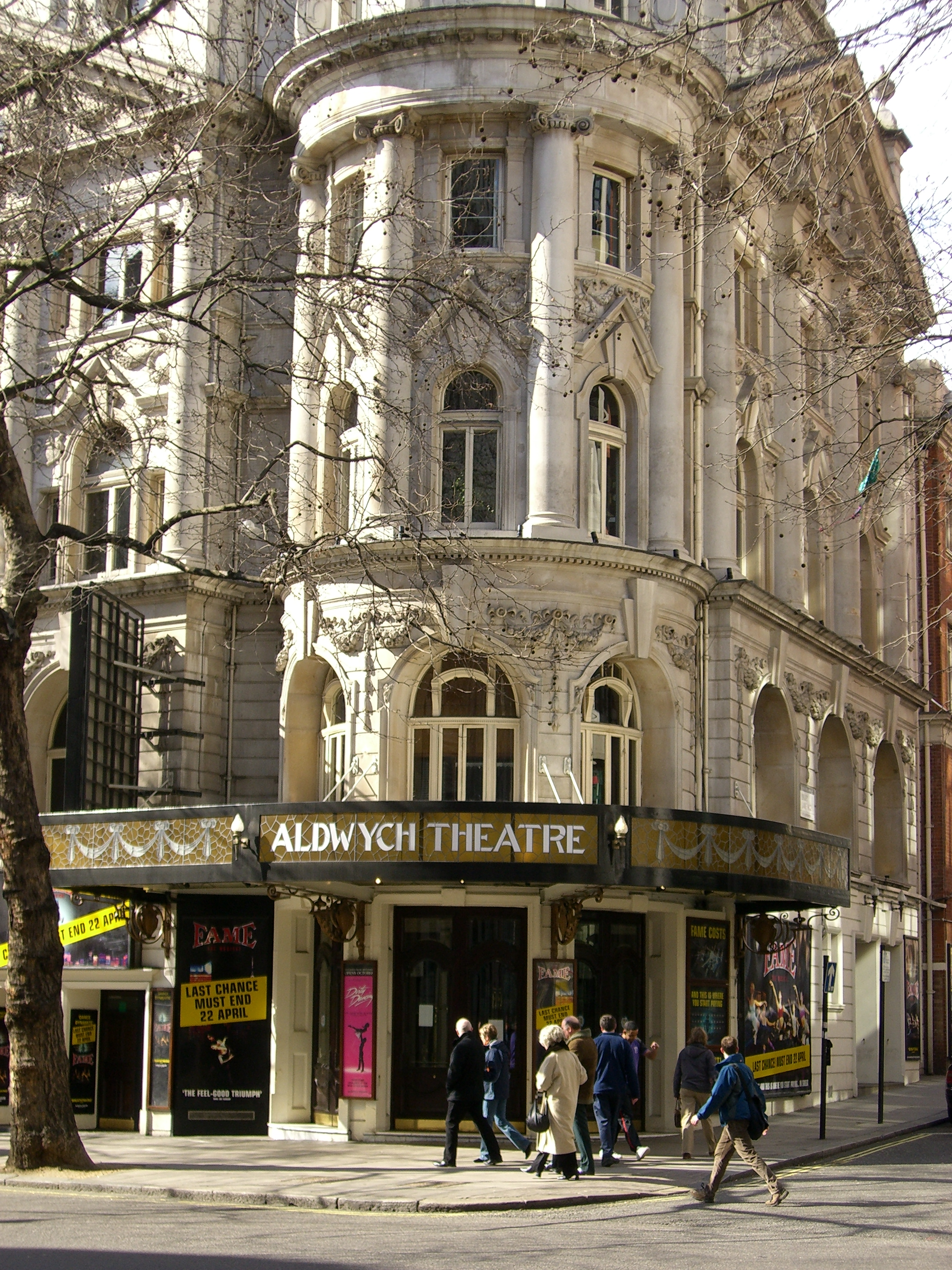
Aldwych Theatre in London Theatreland

=== Administration ===
The administration of the districts of the broader West End area has evolved over time to reflect changing circumstances.

In 1585, during the reign of Elizabeth I, Westminster gained city status as the City and Liberty of Westminster. The City and Liberty of Westminster was an extensive area south of Oxford Street, which originated as a Roman Road. The parishes which made up the City and Liberty of Westminster were mostly daughter parishes of St Margaret's, Westminster - the parish church sited next to Westminster Abbey.

In 1900, Westminster became the Metropolitan Borough of Westminster, retaining its city status. The parishes of Marylebone and Paddington also became Metropolitan boroughs. Further west, the parishes of Kensington and Chelsea similarly became Metropolitan Boroughs, though Chelsea lost its exclave of Kensal Town, which was split between Kensington and Paddington (Kensington and Chelsea are described as part of the West End less than they once were) The combined parishes of Bloomsbury and St Giles, together with most of Holborn (the parts not in the Farringdon Without ward of the City of London) came together to form a new Metropolitan Borough of Holborn.

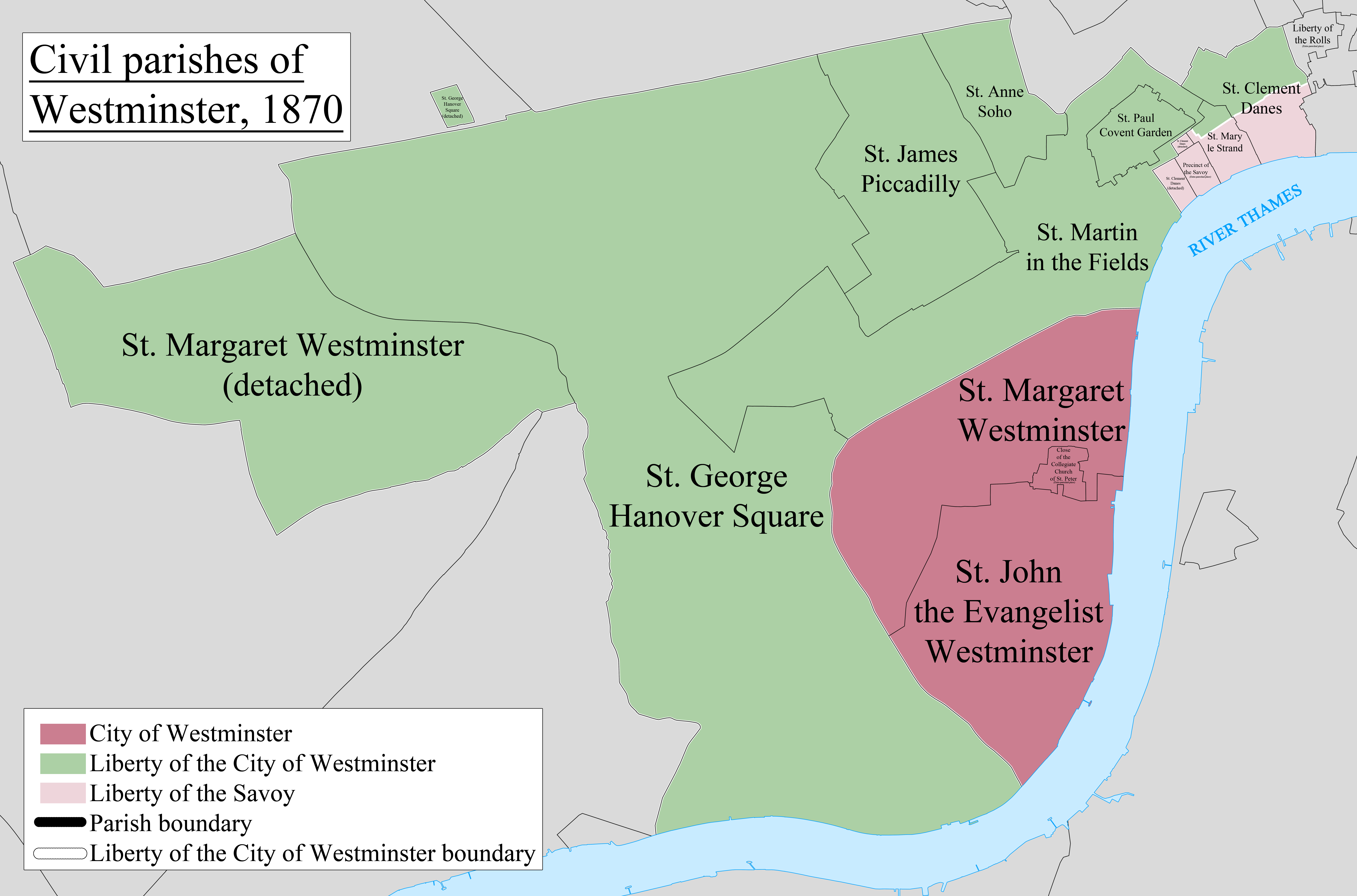
The City and Liberty of Westminster, established in 1585.

In 1965 the Metropolitan Boroughs were replaced by larger new London boroughs. Westminster (south of Oxford Street), merged with the Marylebone and Paddington to the north to form a new London Borough called the City of Westminster. Kensington and Chelsea merged to form the London Borough of Kensington and Chelsea, and the Metropolitan Borough of Holborn joined the new London Borough of Camden.

One of the City of Westminster wards is called "West End". This electoral unit includes some of the most prosperous areas of the borough, including Soho, Mayfair and parts of southern Marylebone. The population of this ward at the 2011 Census was 10,575.

== Notable streets ==
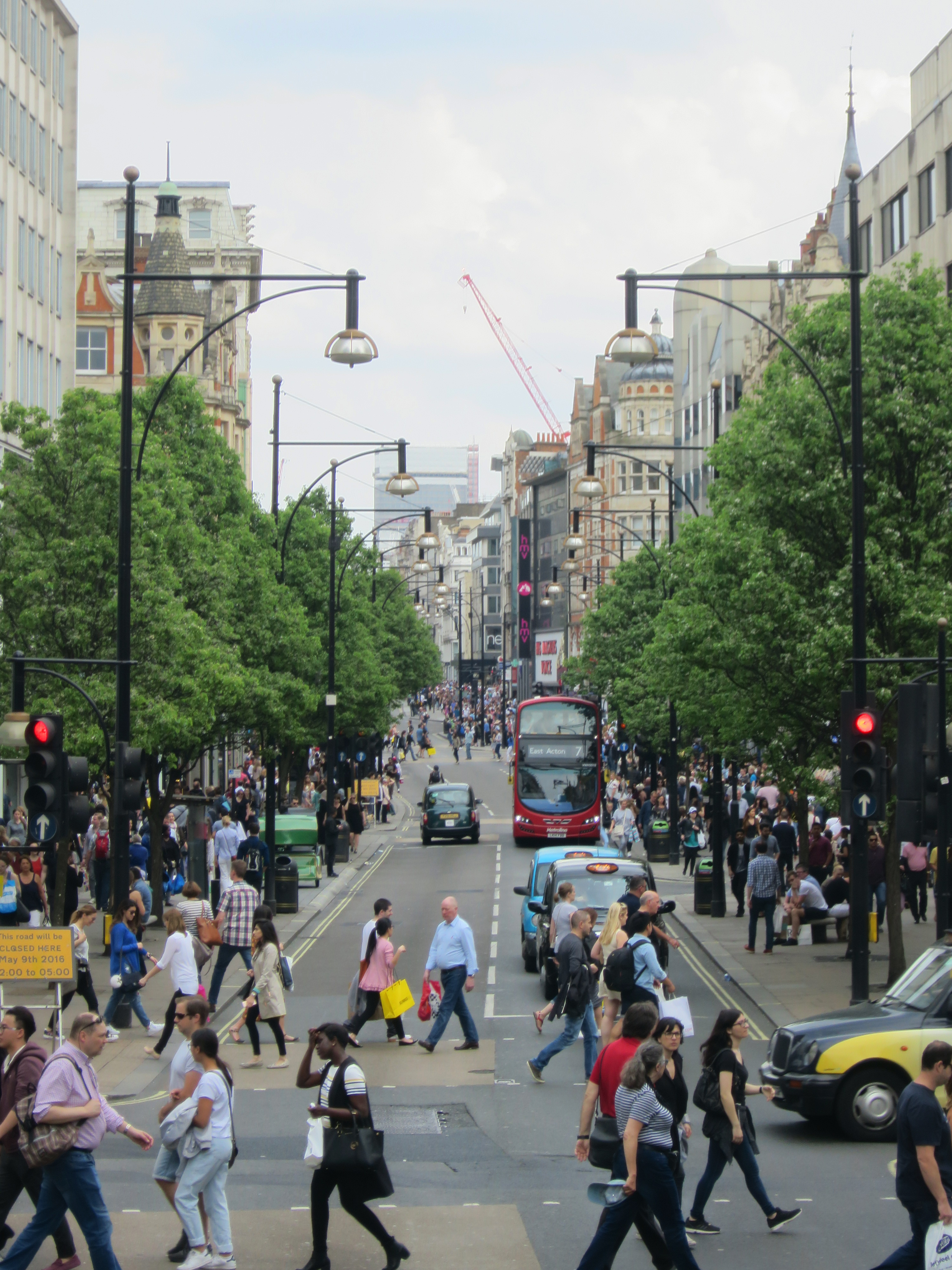
Oxford Street, one of the main West End shopping areas

- Albemarle Street
- Baker Street
- Bond Street
- Carnaby Street
- Charing Cross Road
- Denmark Street
- Great Marlborough Street
- Great Portland Street
- Harley Street
- Haymarket
- High Holborn
- Jermyn Street
- Lisson Grove
- Kingsway
- Old Compton Street
- Oxford Street
- Pall Mall
- Park Lane
- Piccadilly
- Regent Street
- Savile Row
- Shaftesbury Avenue
- Strand
- The Mall
- Wardour Street

== Notable squares and circuses ==
The West End is laid out with many notable public squares and circuses.

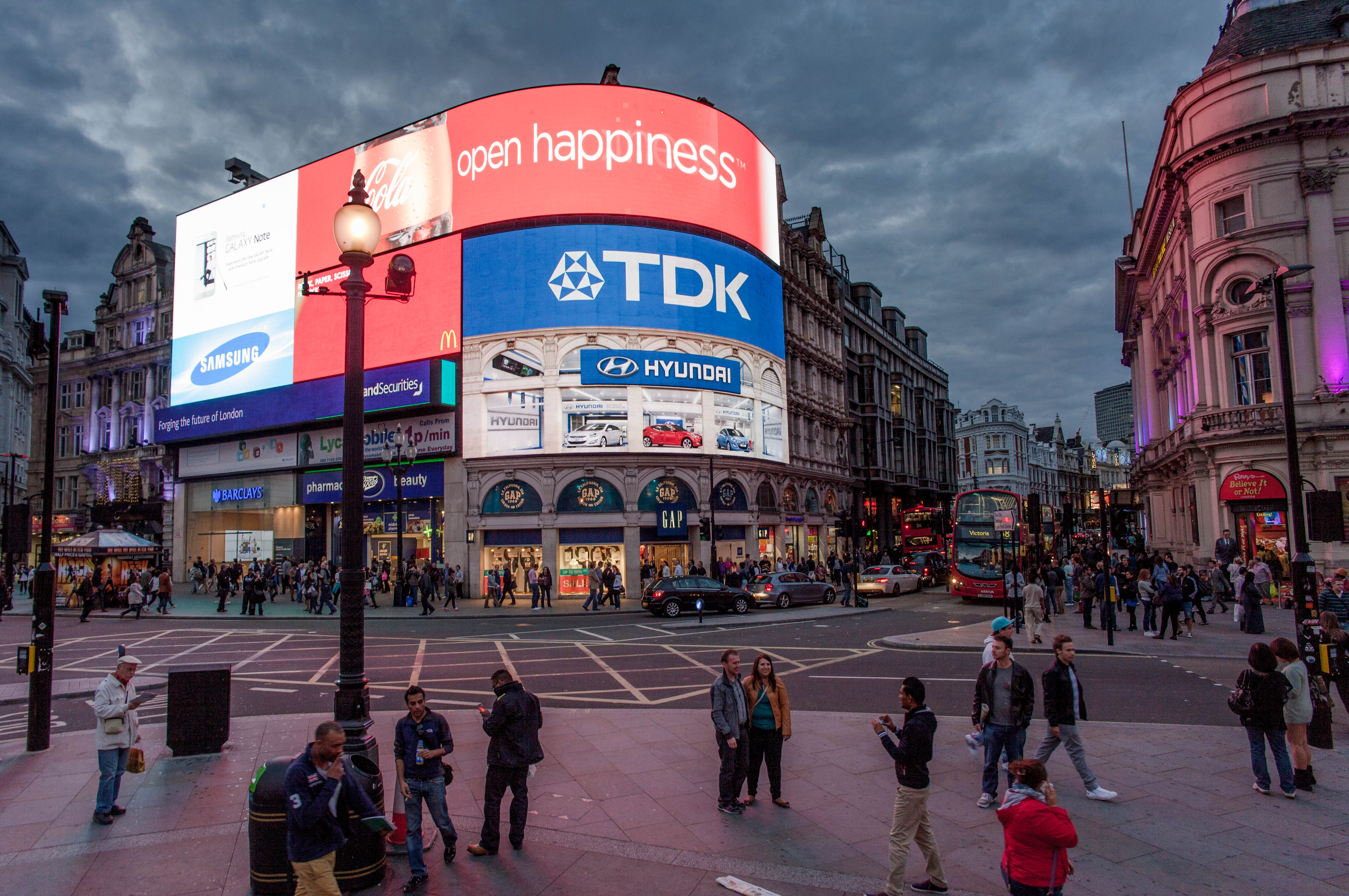
Piccadilly Circus, in the heart of the West End, in September 2012

- Berkeley Square
- Cambridge Circus
- Cavendish Square
- Grosvenor Square
- Hanover Square
- Hyde Park Corner
- Leicester Square
- Manchester Square
- Marble Arch
- Oxford Circus
- Parliament Square
- Piccadilly Circus
- Portman Square
- Russell Square
- Soho Square
- St James's Square
- St Giles Circus
- Trafalgar Square

== Transport ==
London Underground stations in the West End include:

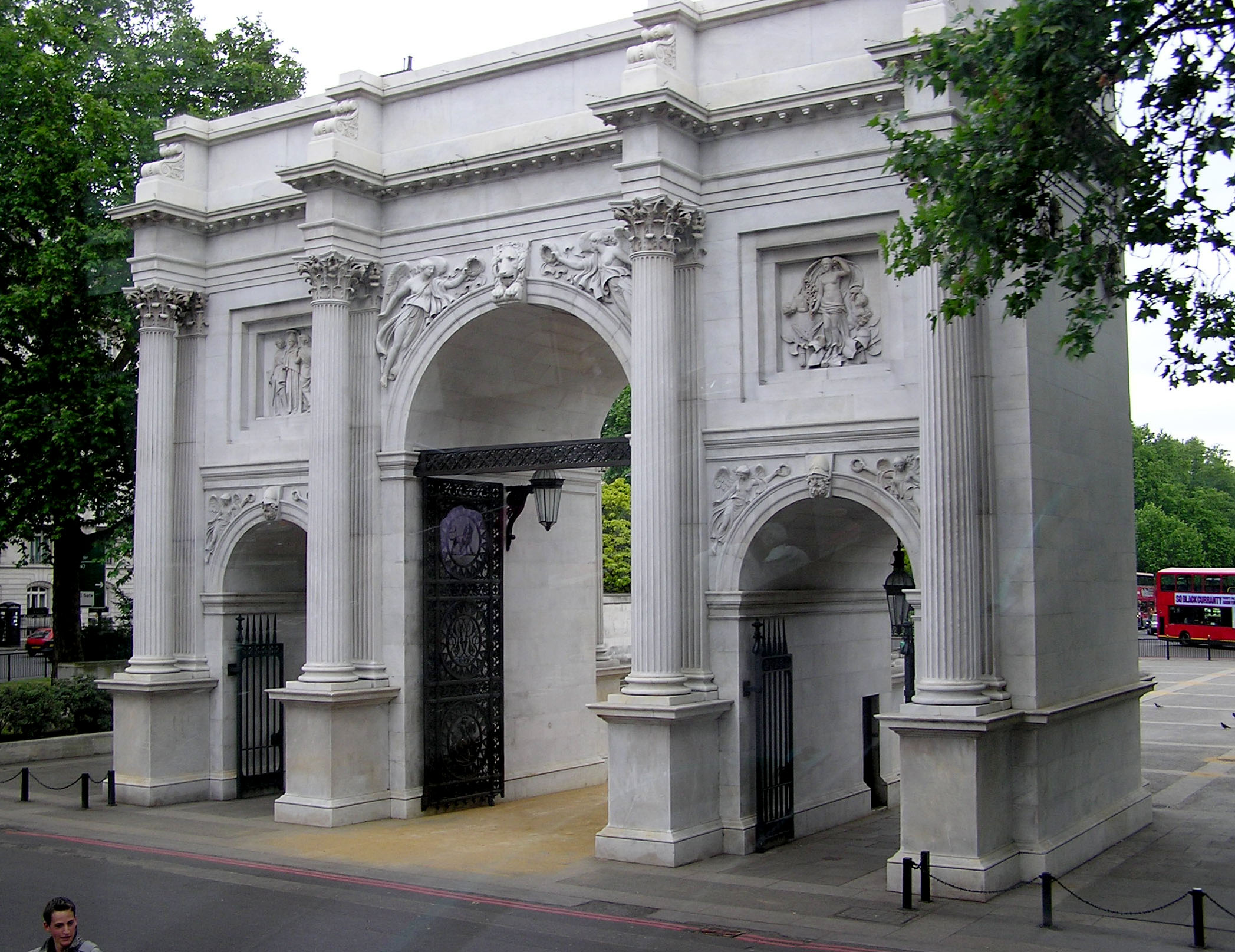
Marble Arch

- Baker Street
- Bond Street
- Charing Cross
- Covent Garden
- Embankment
- Goodge Street
- Great Portland Street
- Green Park
- Holborn
- Hyde Park Corner
- Leicester Square
- Marble Arch
- Oxford Circus
- Piccadilly Circus
- Regent's Park
- Russell Square
- Tottenham Court Road
- Warren Street
