= Tottenham Court Road station =

National Rail and London Underground station

Tottenham Court Road
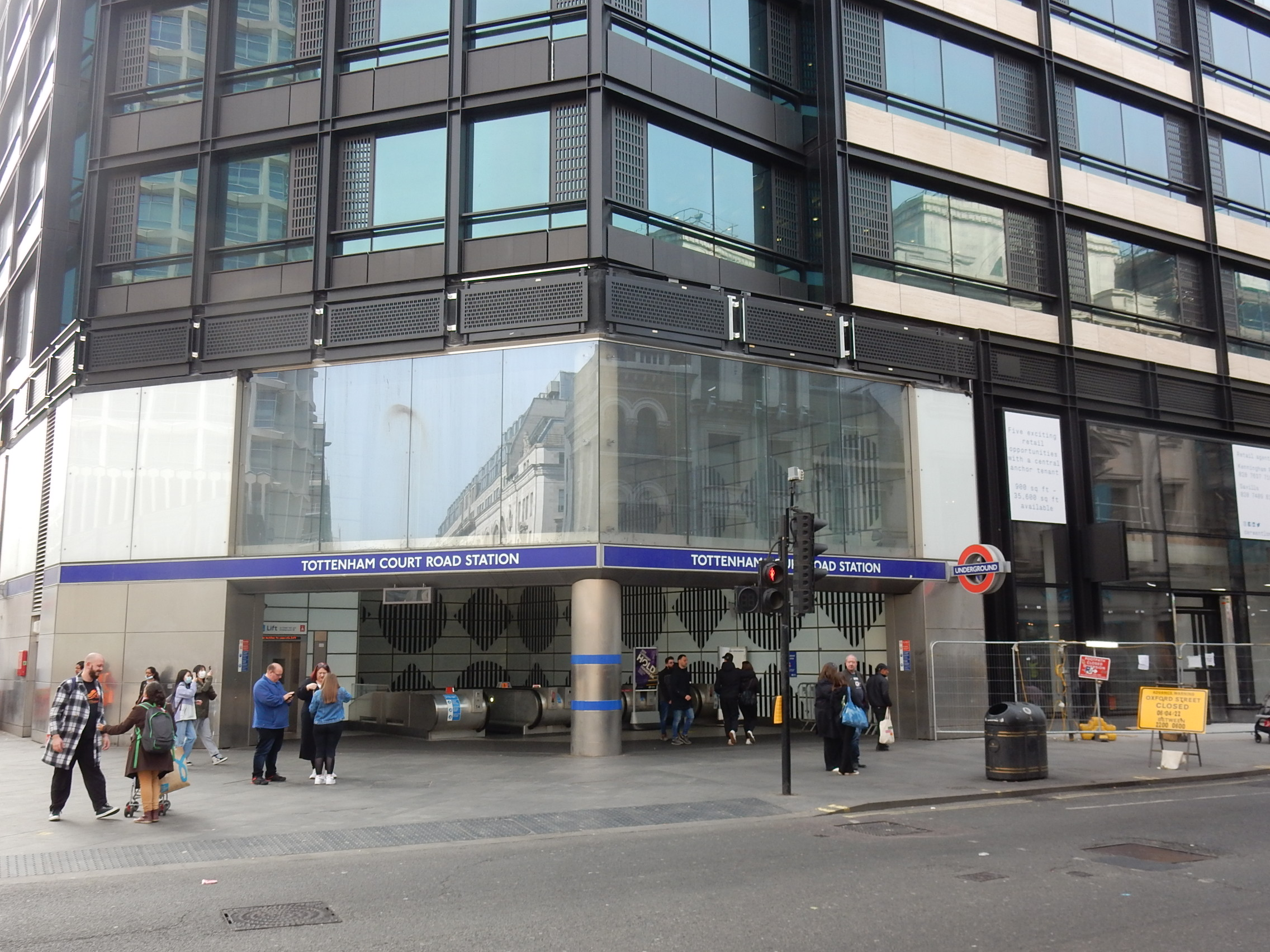
- Main entrance to the eastern ticket hall
- Interactive map of Tottenham Court Road

General information
- Location: St Giles and Soho
- Local authority: London Borough of Camden; City of Westminster
- Managed by: London Underground
- Owner: Transport for London
- Station code: TCR
- Number of platforms: 6
- Fare zone: 1

London Underground annual entry and exit
- 2021: ▲16.04 million
- 2022: ▲48.95 million
- 2023: ▲58.73 million
- 2024: ▲59.45 million
- 2025: ▲60.81 million

National Rail annual entry and exit
- 2022–23: 34.878 million
- 2023–24: ▲64.219 million
- 2024–25: ▲68.134 million

Key dates
- 30 July 1900: Opened (CLR)
- 22 June 1907: Opened (CCE&HR)
- 24 May 2022: Opened (Elizabeth line)

Other information
- External links: TfL station info page; Departures; Facilities
- Coordinates: 51.5162°N 0.1309°W

Tottenham Court Road is an interchange station in the St Giles and Soho areas of the West End of London for London Underground and Elizabeth line services.

The London Underground station is served by the Central and Northern lines. On the Central line, the station is between Oxford Circus and Holborn stations. On the Charing Cross branch of the Northern line, it is between Goodge Street and Leicester Square stations. The Elizabeth line station is between Bond Street and Farringdon stations.

The station is located at St Giles Circus, the junction of Tottenham Court Road, Oxford Street, New Oxford Street and Charing Cross Road and is in London fare zone 1, with a second Elizabeth line entrance at Dean Street.

== History ==
=== Central London Railway ===
The station opened as part of the Central London Railway (CLR) on 30 July 1900. From that date until 24 September 1933, the next station eastbound on the Central line was the now-defunct British Museum; the next stop in that direction is now Holborn. The platforms are under Oxford Street west of St Giles' Circus and were originally connected to the ticket hall via lifts at the east end of the platforms. The original station building was on the south side of Oxford Street and was designed in common with other CLR stations by Harry Bell Measures. The building and its neighbours were demolished in 2009.

=== Charing Cross, Euston & Hampstead Railway ===
The Charing Cross, Euston & Hampstead Railway (CCE&HR, now part of the Northern line) arrived here on 22 June 1907 but used the name Oxford Street until an interchange (linking the eastbound Central line with the southbound Northern line via the ends of the platform) was opened on 3 September 1908 from when the present name was used for both lines. The next station north on the Northern line was originally called Tottenham Court Road, but was renamed to Goodge Street at this time.

The original ticket office was directly beneath St Giles circus and was accessed from stairs on three street corners around the Circus. Its original lift shafts and emergency stairs are still extant. A set of emergency stairs can be used as access down to the ends of the Northern line platform. The lift shafts are used for offices and station facilities.

=== Early improvements ===
Like a number of other central area stations, Tottenham Court Road underwent improvements during the 1920s to replace the original sets of lifts with escalators. Works commenced in 1923; a new subsurface ticket hall, under St Giles Circus, was constructed and the escalators came into service on 28 September 1926 (upper set) and 1 February 1926 (lower set). A shaft for three escalators was driven from the ticket hall under the junction down to the east end of the Central line platforms ending at an intermediate circulation space. A further pair of escalators descend from this level to the north end of the Northern line platforms. The lifts were removed and the redundant shafts were used as ventilation ducts. In 1938 a chiller plant began operating at the station. This was decommissioned in 1949.

Passenger congestion entering and leaving the Northern line platforms was partially eased by the addition of a short single escalator at the centre of the platform leading up to a passageway linking to the intermediate circulation area. However, this was in itself a cause of congestion, as traffic trying to leave the station from the Northern line found itself in the path of traffic entering and travelling to the Central line.

In the early 1980s, the entire station was redecorated, losing the distinctive Leslie Green-designed platform tiling pattern of the Yerkes tube lines (which included the CCE&HR), and the plain white platform tiles of the CLR. It was replaced by distinctive mosaics by Eduardo Paolozzi, located on platforms, passages and escalator entrances.

=== Initial plans for station expansion ===
The station had four entrances to the sub-surface ticket hall from the north-east, south-west and north-west corners of the junction and from a subway beneath the Centre Point building which starts on Andrew Borde Street. The entrances were frequently congested leading to occasions during peak periods of the day when they were briefly closed to prevent overcrowding in the station.

In the aftermath of the King's Cross fire in 1987, London Underground was recommended to investigate "passenger flow and congestion in stations and take remedial action". A Parliamentary bill was tabled in 1991 to permit London Underground to improve and expand the frequently congested station, however this was not proceeded with. In 2000, London Underground consulted on a station upgrade including a new larger ticket hall, new escalators and step free access, which would have taken 4 years to construct.

=== Expansion as part of Crossrail ===
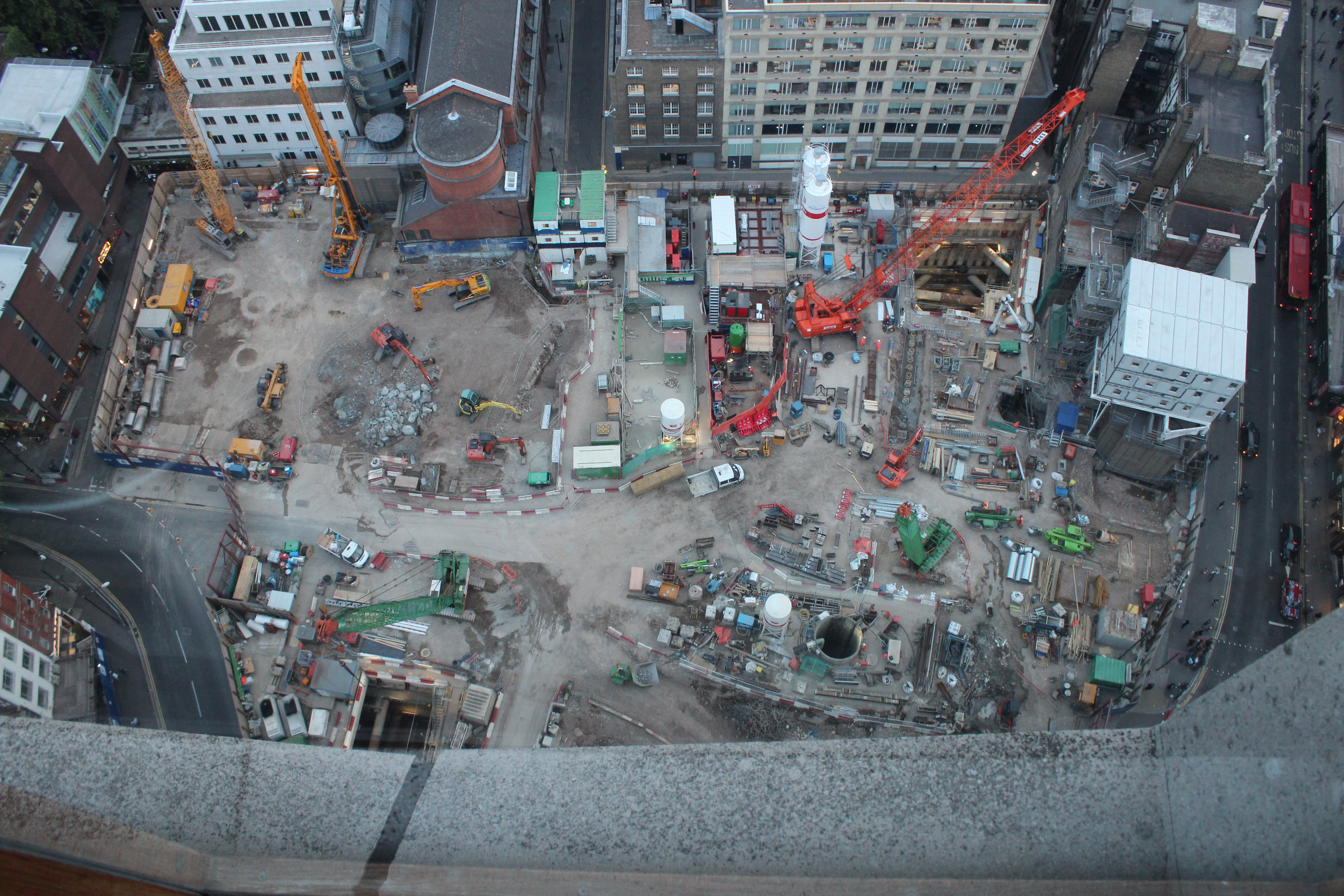
Construction of the station expansion work in 2011

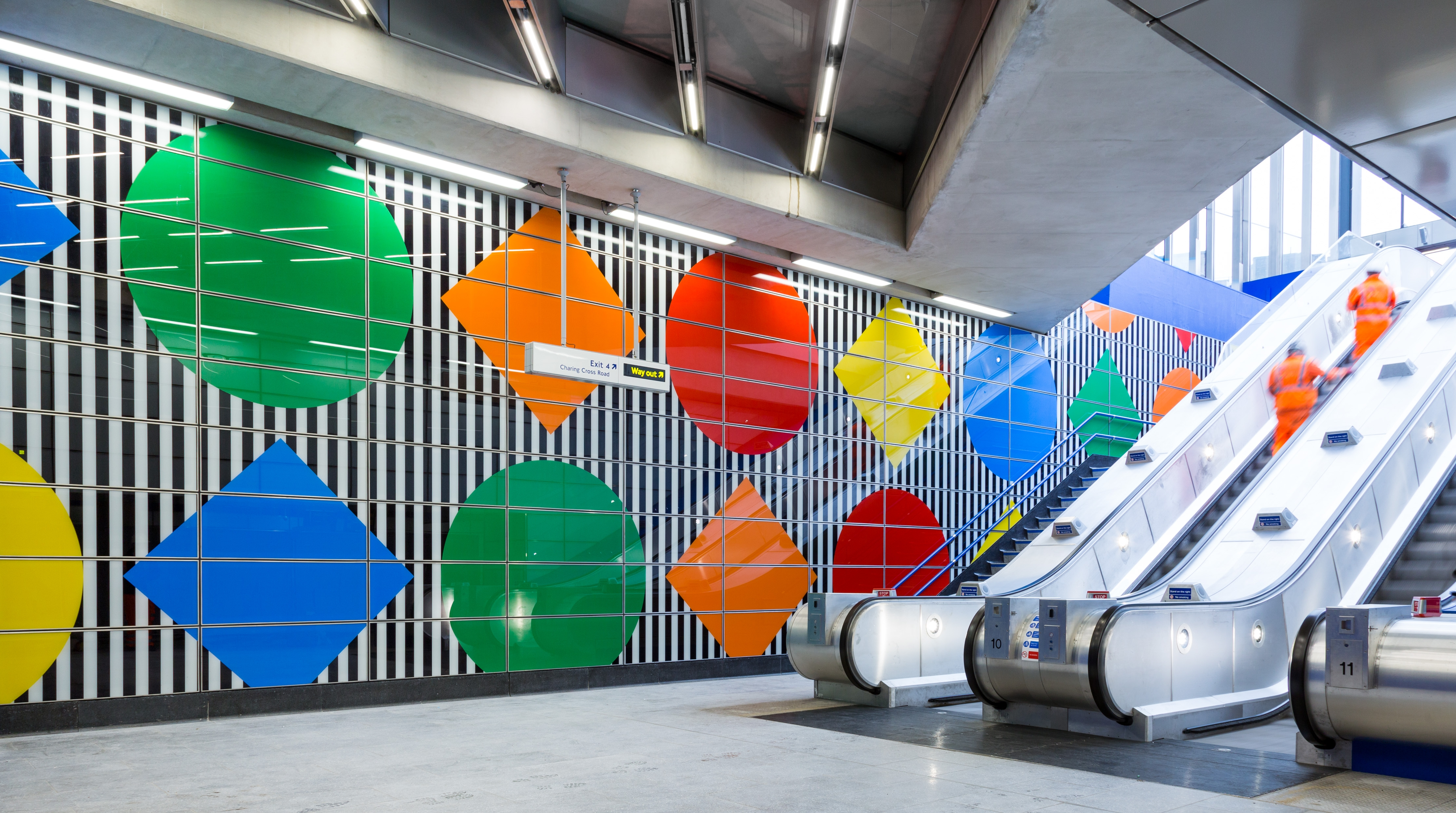
Tottenham Court Road Eastern Ticket Hall after expansion, with Daniel Buren's artwork.

The station was eventually reconstructed and upgraded in the mid 2010s as part of the Crossrail project to construct the Elizabeth line, with the £500 million station upgrade taking eight years. To enable the station expansion work to occur, both the Astoria theatres and the original Central line entrance were demolished. During construction, the Central and Northern lines were alternately closed for several months to allow for upgrade works to take place.

Upon completion in 2017, the project delivered:

- A new ticket hall six times larger than previous, located below St Giles Circus and the forecourt of Centre Point
- New public plaza outside Centre Point, with station entrances designed by Hawkins\Brown
- New dedicated set of escalators to access the Northern line
- New and expanded passageways underground
- Escalators down to the eastern end of the future Elizabeth line station.
- Step-free access throughout the station
- Restoration of existing artwork by Eduardo Paolozzi, and a new artwork in the ticket hall by Daniel Buren

On Dean Street, a dedicated western entrance and ticket hall was built to access the new Elizabeth line platforms. These platforms stretch for 230 m (750 ft) between the two ticket halls, underneath Soho Square. The completed western entrance and Crossrail platforms were handed over to TfL in early 2021. Crossrail links Tottenham Court Road to Canary Wharf, Abbey Wood, Stratford, and Shenfield in the east with Paddington, Heathrow and Reading in the west. The central section of the Elizabeth line opened on 24 May 2022 between Paddington and Abbey Wood. Direct service to Reading, Heathrow, Stratford and Shenfield commenced on 6 November 2022.

As part of a plan to raise £500 million from development above new Crossrail stations, a residential development of 92 homes as well as retail units will be built above the western ticket hall by developer Galliard Homes and a new West End theatre as well as retail and office space will be built above the eastern ticket hall by developer Derwent London. The new theatre, @sohoplace, opened on 15 October 2022 and was the first West End theatre to open in over 50 years.

== Artworks ==
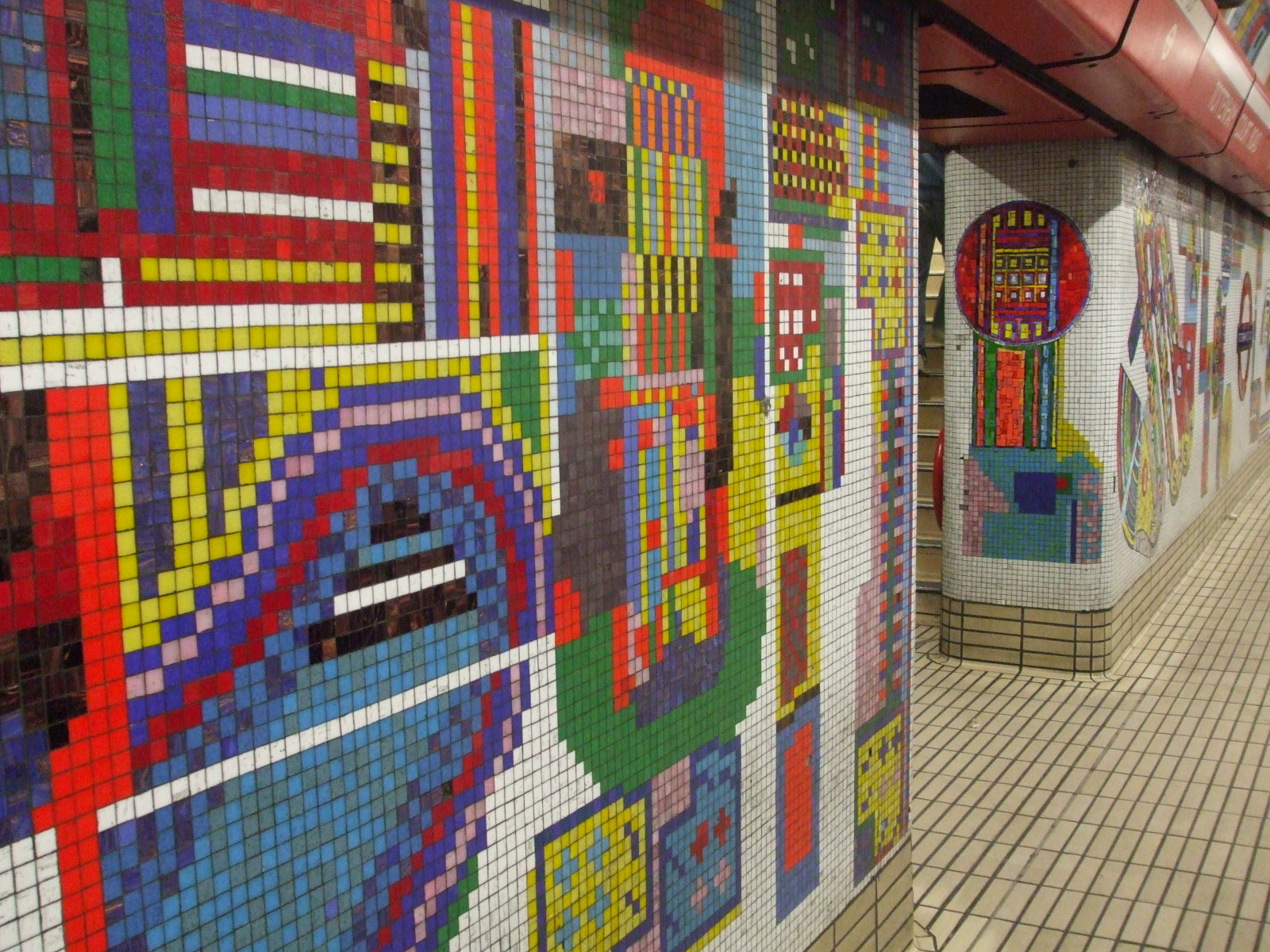
Eduardo Paolozzi mosaics (1982) on the Central line platform

In the mid 1980s, Eduardo Paolozzi was commissioned to create an artwork for the station. The design includes panels of tessellated and hand-cut smalti mural mosaic, and is a distinct and noticeable feature of the station. The frenetic design was intended to reflect the station's position adjacent to Tottenham Court Road's large concentration of hi-fi and electronics shops. During the expansion of the station for Crossrail, sections of the mosaic were restored, moved or replaced while other section were destroyed, some sections of which have been removed to be conserved at the University of Edinburgh.

As part of the expansion of the Eastern ticket hall, Art on the Underground commissioned an artwork by Daniel Buren, a French conceptual artist. This work, 'Diamonds and Circles', works 'in situ', was Buren's first permanent public commission in the UK. It comprises colourful diamond and circle shapes, which contrast with Buren's trademark stripes in black and white, fixed to internal glass walls throughout the ticket hall. The artwork was completed in 2017.

As part of the Crossrail project, two artworks were commissioned by Turner Prize–winning artists, one for each ticket hall. At the eastern ticket hall, Richard Wright created a mural of geometric patterns in gold leaf on the concrete ceiling above the Crossrail escalators. At the western ticket hall, Douglas Gordon installed a video artwork above the escalators, with thought provoking statements translated into a variety of languages appearing and disappearing. Gordon's work was unveiled in 2024.

== Services ==
Services at Tottenham Court Road are operated by the Elizabeth line, and the Central and Northern lines of the London Underground.

The typical off-peak service in trains per hour (tph) is:

| Operator/line | Direction | Frequency to destination |
|---|---|---|
| London Underground; Central line | Westbound | 3 tph to White City; 9 tph to Ealing Broadway; 3 tph to Northolt; 9 tph to West Ruislip |
| London Underground; Central line | Eastbound | 3 tph to Newbury Park; 9 tph to Hainault; 3 tph to Loughton; 9 tph to Epping |
| London Underground; Northern line | Northbound | 10 tph to Edgware; 8 tph to High Barnet; 2 tph to Mill Hill East |
| London Underground; Northern line | Southbound | 10 tph to Kennington; 10 tph to Battersea Power Station |
| Elizabeth line | Westbound | 6 tph to London Paddington; 4 tph to Heathrow Terminal 4; 2 tph to Heathrow Terminal 5; 2 tph to Maidenhead; 2 tph to Reading |
| Elizabeth line | Eastbound | 8 tph to Abbey Wood; 8 tph to Shenfield |

As of 2024, it is the fourth busiest station on the London Underground and the busiest Central line station with 62 million passengers using it per year.

The station is also served by a night service on Friday and Saturday nights as part of the Night Tube. The station is served by Central line trains every 10 minutes in each direction and Northern line trains every 7–8 minutes in each direction.

| Preceding station | London Underground | Following station |
|---|---|---|
| Oxford Circus towards Ealing Broadway or West Ruislip | Central line | Holborn towards Epping, Hainault or Woodford via Newbury Park |
| Goodge Street towards Edgware, Mill Hill East or High Barnet | Northern line Charing Cross branch | Leicester Square towards Battersea Power Station, Morden or Kennington |
| Preceding station | Elizabeth line | Following station |
| Bond Street towards Reading or Heathrow Airport Terminal 4 or Terminal 5 | Elizabeth line | Farringdon towards Abbey Wood or Shenfield |
Former services
| Preceding station | London Underground | Following station |
| Oxford Circus towards Ealing Broadway | Central line | British Museum towards Liverpool Street |

== Future developments ==
=== Crossrail 2 ===
The Crossrail 2 project proposed a station at Tottenham Court Road, the only planned interchange between the Elizabeth line and Crossrail 2. The expanded station built as part of the Crossrail project took the future demands of Crossrail 2 into account, which will allow for less construction disruption if the line is built. The proposals involve a new Crossrail 2 ticket hall on the site of Curzon Soho on Shaftesbury Avenue. This has been criticised by campaigners. The station and ticket hall site were first safeguarded as part of the route during the development of the Chelsea-Hackney line in 1991. In November 2020, plans for Crossrail 2 were shelved.

== In popular culture ==
- The station was used for a sequence in the 1981 film An American Werewolf in London.
- A scene in the 2008 film The Bank Job is set in the station, though it was shot at Aldwych tube station.
- A scene in the musical We Will Rock You is set in the station; the musical played across the street at the Dominion Theatre from 2002 to 2014.

== Connections ==
London Buses day and night routes serve the station.
