= Russell Square tube station =

London Underground station

Russell Square
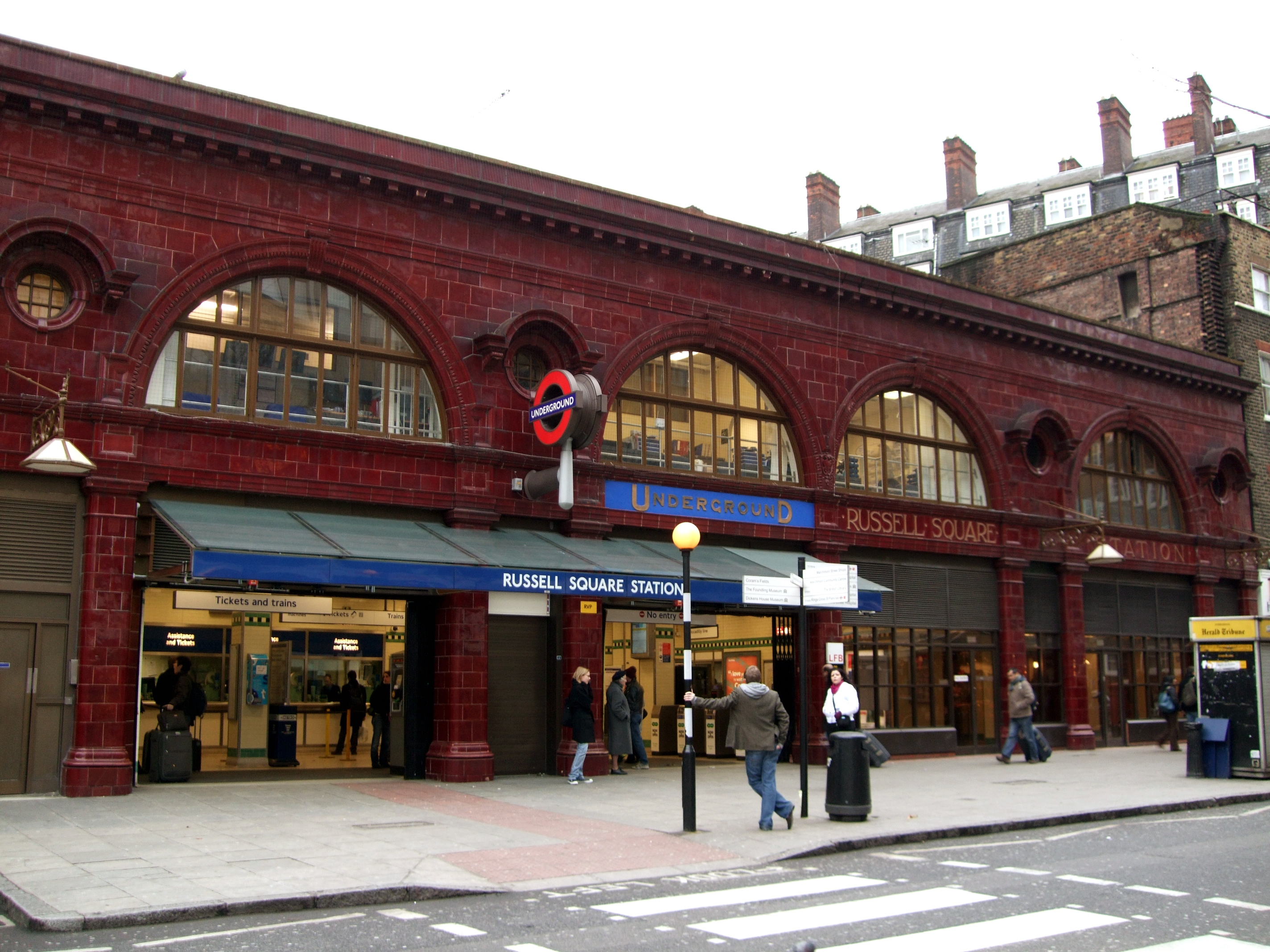
- Station entrance
- Interactive map of Russell Square

General information
- Location: Bloomsbury
- Local authority: Camden
- Managed by: London Underground
- Number of platforms: 2
- Fare zone: 1

London Underground annual entry and exit
- 2021: ▲3.66 million
- 2022: ▲8.59 million
- 2023: ▼7.82 million
- 2024: ▲8.57 million
- 2025: ▼8.29 million

Railway companies
- Original company: Great Northern, Piccadilly and Brompton Railway

Key dates
- 15 December 1906: Station opened

Listed status
- Listing grade: II
- Entry number: 1401730
- Added to list: 20 July 2011

Other information
- External links: TfL station info page
- Coordinates: 51.52306°N 0.12444°W

Russell Square is a London Underground station. It is located near Russell Square on Bernard Street, Bloomsbury, in the London Borough of Camden. The station is on the Piccadilly line, between Holborn and King's Cross St Pancras stations. It is in London fare zone 1.

Russell Square is not far from the British Museum, the University of London's main campus, Great Ormond Street Hospital, Russell Square Gardens and the Brunswick Centre.

Designed by London architect Leslie Green, the building is an example of the Modern Style, a British variant of Art Nouveau.

== History ==
The station was opened by the Great Northern, Piccadilly and Brompton Railway on 15 December 1906. The station was designed by Leslie Green. In 2001, the station was closed for 13 months for refurbishment, reopening in February 2002.

=== 2005 London bombings ===
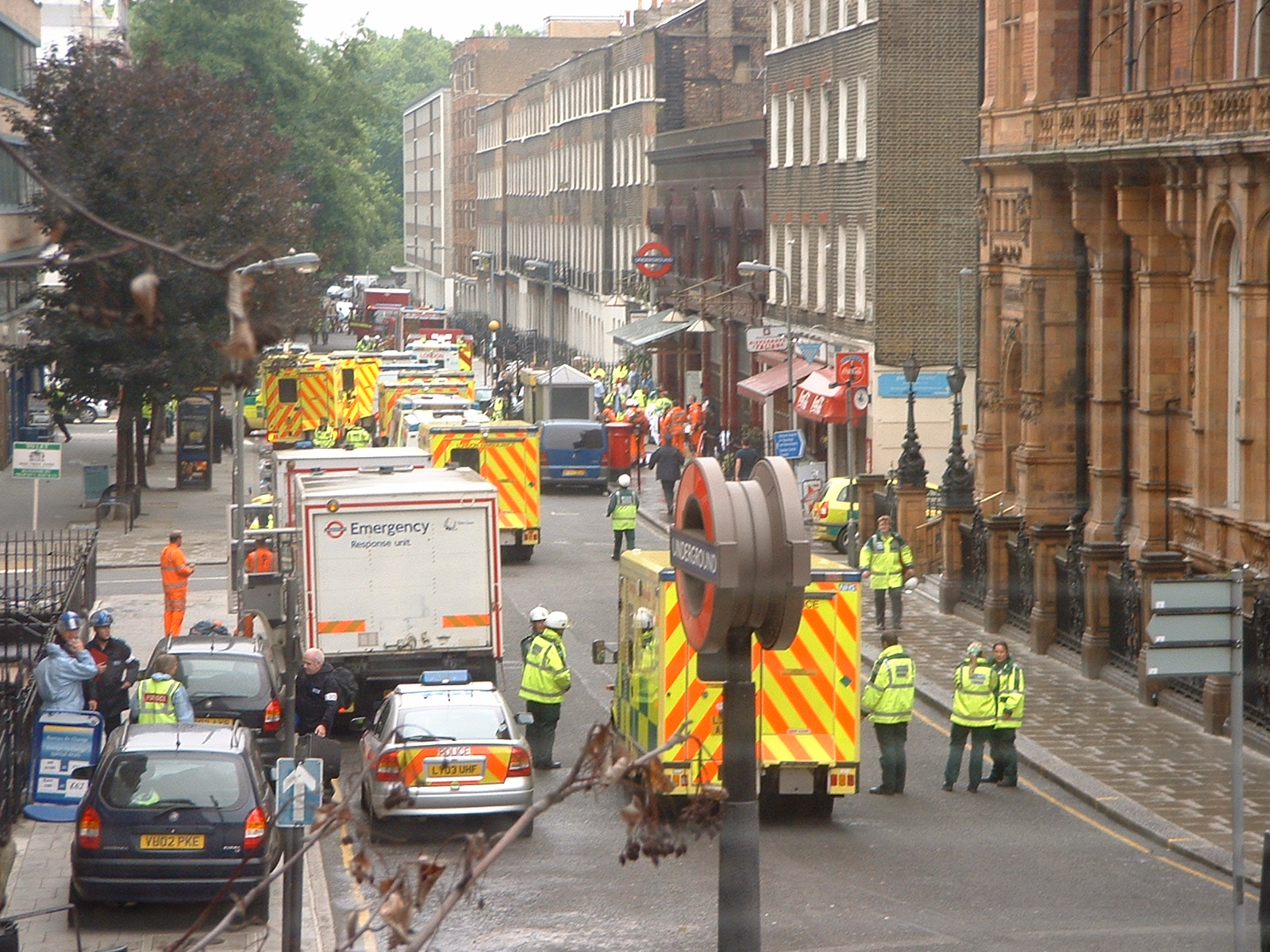
Ambulances at Russell Square following the attack

On 7 July 2005, in a co-ordinated bomb attack, an explosion in a train travelling between King's Cross St. Pancras and Russell Square resulted in the deaths of 26 people. Another bomb later exploded on a bus at Tavistock Square.

A plaque remembering the victims, identical to the one at King's Cross St Pancras tube station, is located at the station.

=== Station listing ===
On 20 July 2011, English Heritage gave the station buildings Grade II listed status, describing it as:

a good example of a station designed by Leslie Green to serve the GNP & BR, later the Piccadilly Line, retaining original tiled lettering. The interior, while altered, features of interest survive at lower levels including tiling and directional signage. The Yerkes group of stations designed by Leslie Green illustrate a remarkable phase in the development of the capital's transport system, with the pioneering use of a strong and consistent corporate image; the characteristic ox-blood faience façades are instantly recognisable and count among the most iconic of London building types.

== The station today ==
The station is a Grade II listed building.

Russell Square station has three lifts, which are all fifty-passenger lifts built by Wadsworth. There are no escalators but the platforms can be reached using a spiral staircase with 176 steps.

The station has seven gates and a Wi-Fi service.

=== Platform level tiling ===
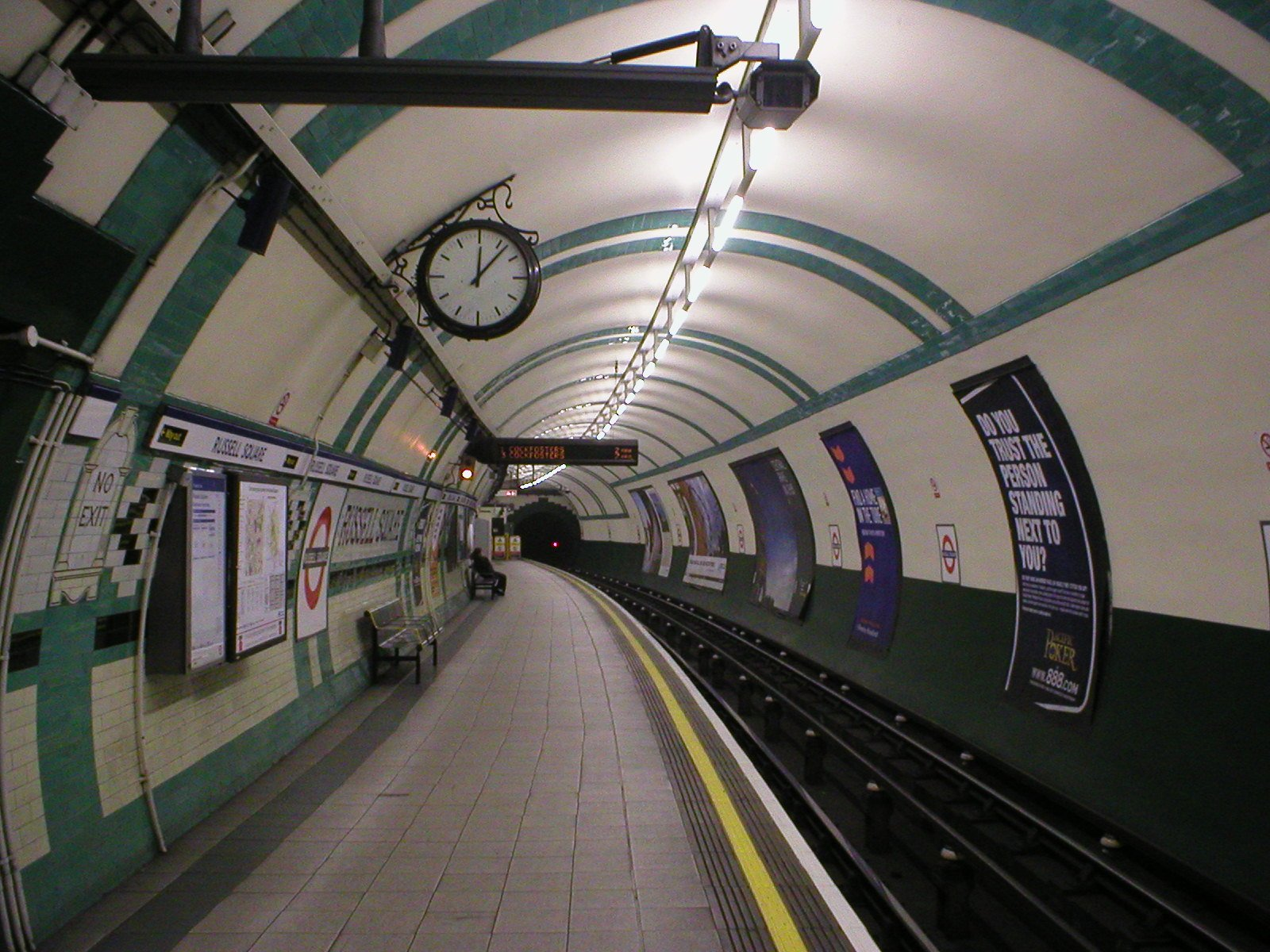
The distinctive platform level tilework

The stations on the central part of the Piccadilly line, as well as some sections of the Northern line, were financed by Charles Yerkes, and are famous for the Leslie Green designed red station buildings and distinctive platform tiling. Each station had its own unique tile pattern and colours.

== Services ==
Russell Square station is on the Piccadilly line in London fare zone 1. It is between Holborn to the west and King's Cross St Pancras to the east. Train frequencies vary throughout the day, but generally operate every 4–7 minutes between 05:56 and 00:28 in both directions.

Preceding station	London Underground	Following station
Holborn towards Uxbridge, Rayners Lane or Heathrow Airport (Terminal 4 or Terminal 5)	Piccadilly line	King's Cross St Pancras towards Cockfosters or Arnos Grove

== Connections ==
Day and nighttime London Buses routes serve the station.

== In popular culture ==
Russell Square tube station was used as the location for the 1972 horror film Death Line, which starred Donald Pleasence, Christopher Lee and Clive Swift.

The 1978 Armchair Thriller serial, "The Girl Who Walked Quickly" had scenes filmed inside and outside Russell Square tube station. The plot involved a bomb being planted inside the station, killing 10 people. The filmed scenes involved actor Denis Lawson.
