= British Museum tube station =

Disused tube station in London, England

British Museum
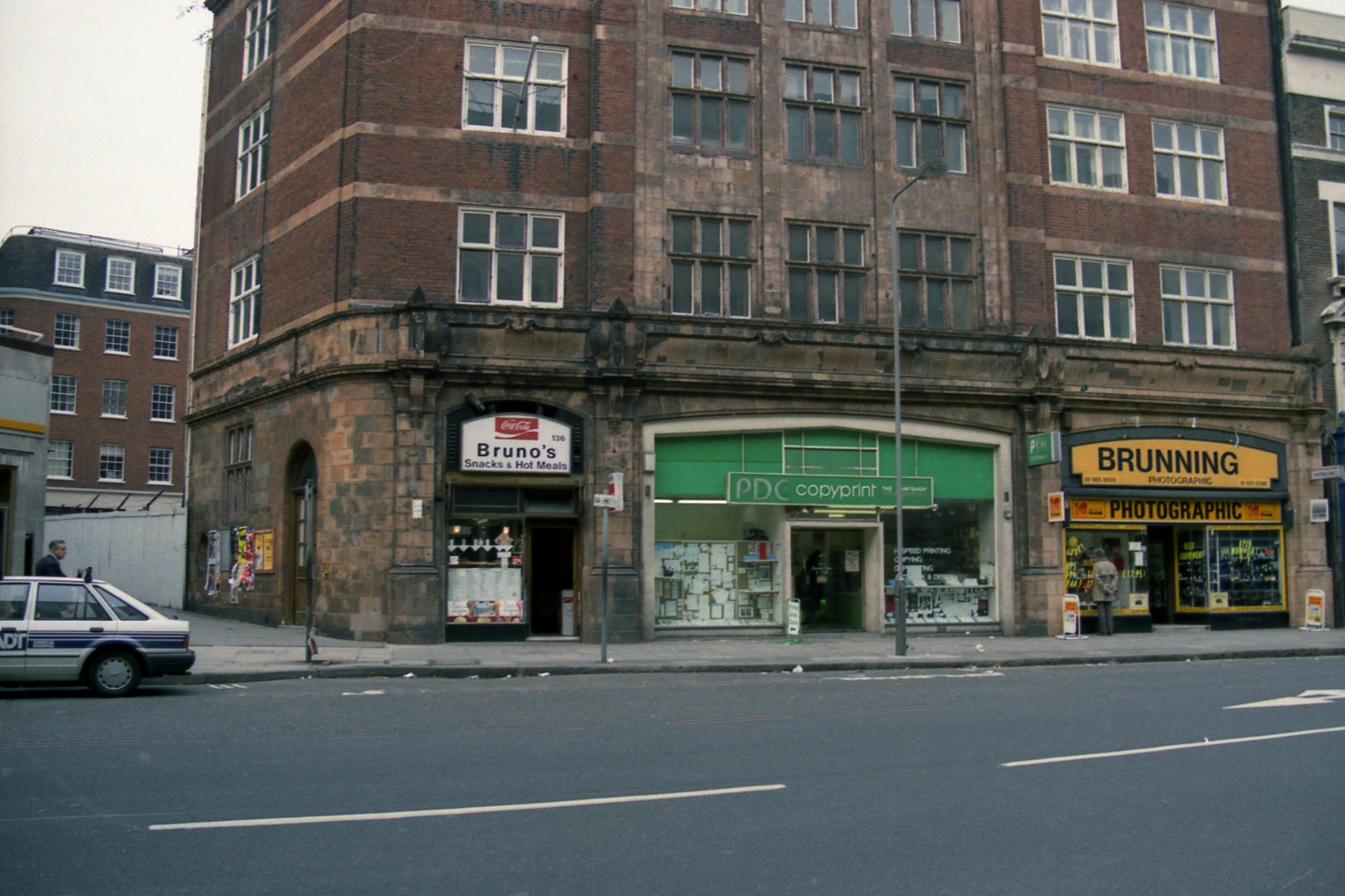
- The station after closure
- Interactive map of British Museum

General information
- Location: Holborn
- Local authority: Holborn
- Owner: Central London Railway
- Number of platforms: 2

Key dates
- 30 July 1900: Opened
- 24 September 1933: Closed
- Replaced by: Holborn

Other information
- Coordinates: 51.5175°N 0.1228°W

British Museum was a station on the London Underground, located in Holborn, central London. It was latterly served by the Central line and took its name from the nearby British Museum in Great Russell Street.

The station was opened by the Central London Railway in 1900. In 1933, with the expansion of Holborn station, less than 100 yards (91 m) away, British Museum station was permanently closed. It was subsequently used as a military office and command post, but in 1989 the surface building was demolished. A portion of the eastbound tunnel, visible from passing trains, is used to store materials for track maintenance.

== History ==
British Museum station was opened on 30 July 1900 by the Central London Railway (CLR; now the Central line), with its entrance located at No. 133, High Holborn (now Hogarth House, a co-working/workspace venue), near the junction with New Oxford Street. In December 1906, Holborn station was opened by the Great Northern, Piccadilly and Brompton Railway (GNP&BR; now the Piccadilly line) less than 100 yards away. Despite being built and operated by separate companies, it was common for the underground railways to plan routes and locate stations so that interchanges could be easily formed between services. This had been done by other lines connecting with the CLR stations at Oxford Circus and Tottenham Court Road, but an interchange station was not initially constructed between the GNP&BR and the CLR because the tunnel alignment to British Museum station would not have been suitable for the GNP&BR's route to its Strand station (later renamed Aldwych). The junction between High Holborn and the newly constructed Kingsway was also a more prominent location for a station than that chosen by the CLR.

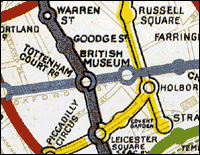
British Museum station featured on an old version of the Tube map

The possibility of an underground passageway was initially mooted, but the idea suffered from the complexity of tunnelling between the stations. Holborn station was, in any case, better situated than British Museum, as it had better tram connections (Holborn had a stop on the now defunct Kingsway tramway subway). A proposal to enlarge the tunnels under High Holborn to create new platforms at Holborn station for the CLR and to abandon the British Museum station was originally included in a private bill submitted to parliament by the CLR in November 1913, although the First World War prevented any work taking place. The works were eventually carried out as part of the modernisation of Holborn station at the beginning of the 1930s when escalators were installed in place of lifts. British Museum station was closed on 24 September 1933, with the new platforms at Holborn opening the following day.

British Museum station was subsequently used up to the 1960s as a military administrative office and emergency command post, but the surface station building was demolished in 1989, and the platforms could no longer be accessed from street level. The platforms have since been removed, thus lowering the entire tunnel floor to track level. A portion of the eastbound tunnel is used by engineers to store materials for track maintenance, which can be seen from passing trains.

== In popular culture ==
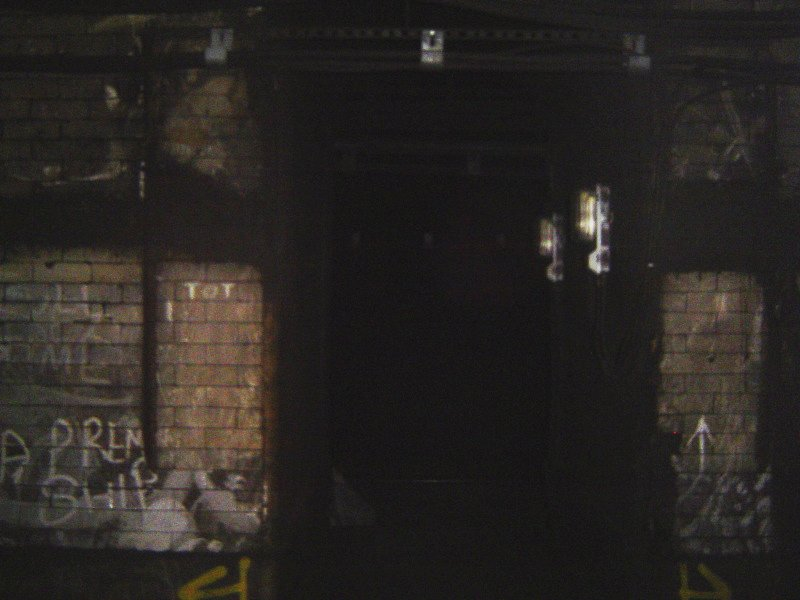
The station in 2004

- The station briefly featured in the computer game Broken Sword: The Smoking Mirror, in which Nico Collard escapes from the British Museum and finds the station. She then manages to stop the passing trains. The station in the game, however, is depicted as having its exit actually inside the British Museum itself. A station named 'Museum' also features in the earlier game Beneath a Steel Sky, by the same company, but the apparent Australian setting for the latter game, as well as its proximity to a station named 'St. James' suggests this is actually the Museum railway station in Sydney.
- The station is reputed to be haunted by the ghost of the daughter of an Egyptian Pharaoh called Amen-ra which would appear and scream so loudly that the noise would carry down the tunnels to adjoining stations.

== See also ==
- List of former and unopened London Underground stations

Preceding station	London Underground	Following station
Tottenham Court Road towards Ealing Broadway	Central line	Chancery Lane towards Liverpool Street
