= Goodge Street tube station =

London Underground station

Goodge Street
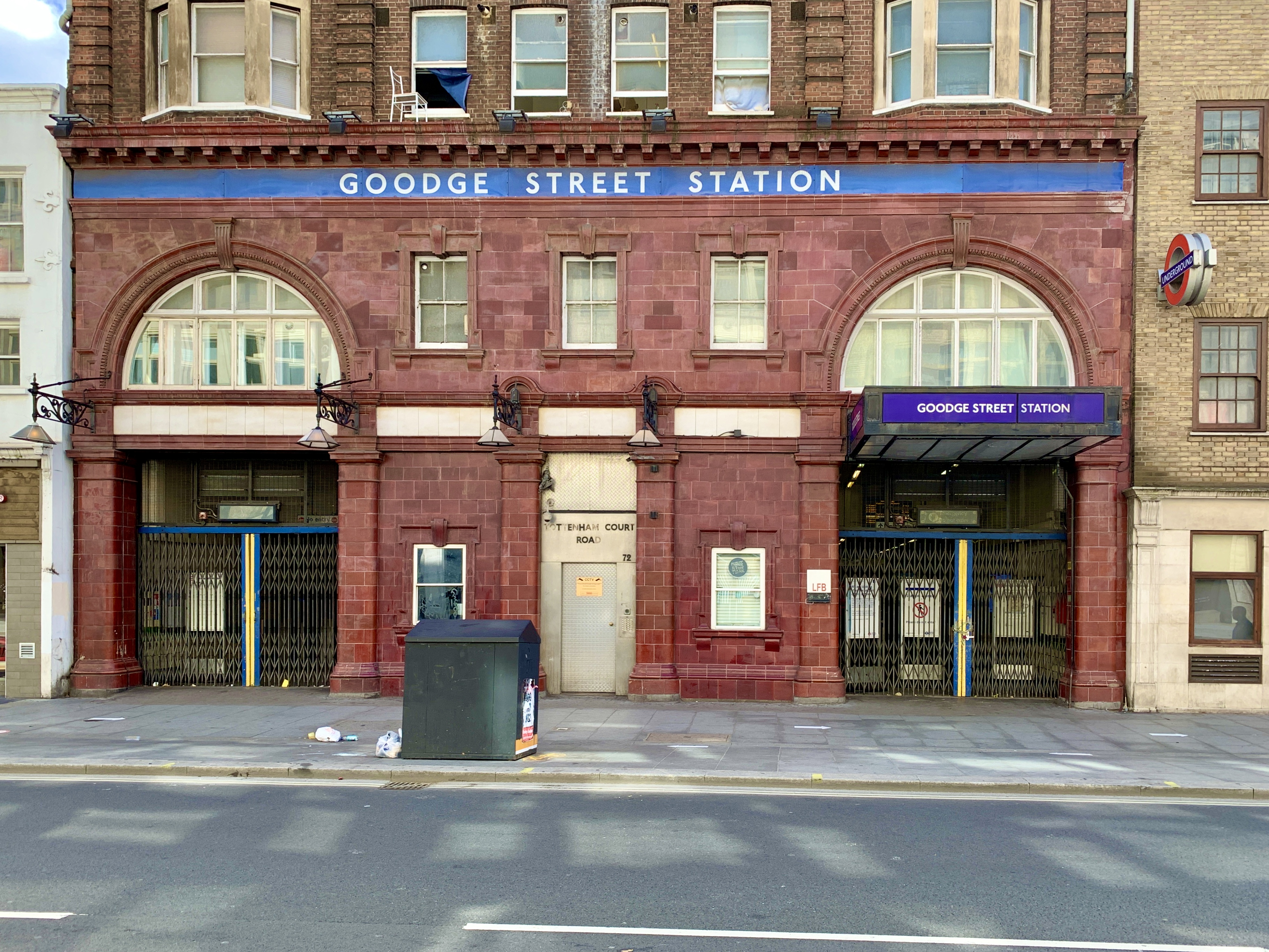
- Entrance on Tottenham Court Road
- Interactive map of Goodge Street

General information
- Location: Tottenham Court Road, Fitzrovia
- Local authority: London Borough of Camden
- Managed by: London Underground
- Number of platforms: 2
- Fare zone: 1

London Underground annual entry and exit
- 2021: ▲2.54 million
- 2022: ▲5.15 million
- 2023: ▼5.11 million
- 2024: ▲5.21 million
- 2025: ▼5.06 million

Key dates
- 22 June 1907: Opened (CCE&HR)

Other information
- External links: TfL station info page
- Coordinates: 51.52083°N 0.13444°W

Goodge Street (/ˈɡuːdʒ ˌstriːt/) is a London Underground station. It is located on Tottenham Court Road in Fitzrovia, in the London Borough of Camden. The station is on the Charing Cross branch of the Northern line, between Warren Street and Tottenham Court Road stations. It is in London fare zone 1.

== Location ==
The station is on the western side of Tottenham Court Road, a short distance north of the junction with Goodge Street. It is one of three stations that directly serve the Fitzrovia area, the others being Warren Street and Great Portland Street.

== History ==
It was opened on 22 June 1907 as Tottenham Court Road by the Charing Cross, Euston and Hampstead Railway, but changed to the present name on 9 March 1908 before an interchange was built between the previously separate (and differently named) Northern line and Central line stations at the present Tottenham Court Road station. Goodge Street is named after John Goodge, who developed the land in the early 18th-century.

=== Deep-level air-raid shelter ===
Goodge Street has a Second World War deep-level air-raid shelter underneath it, and is one of eight such stations. From August 1943 until the end of the Second World War the Goodge Street shelter was used by the Supreme Headquarters Allied Expeditionary Force (SHAEF) as an alternative headquarters to Norfolk House and the offices on Grosvenor Square, to be used in the event of successful bombing or rocket attack on those locations. The shelter has two entrances, one on Chenies Street and the other on Tottenham Court Road next to the American International Church.

In the invasion preparations, Goodge Street station was used only as a signals installation by the United States Army Signal Corps. It was one of a number of signals installations for communications in and around London. Among these installations were SHAEF headquarters at 20 Grosvenor Square and the basement of the Selfridges department store on Oxford Street; both buildings exist today.

After the war the shelters were used as a hostel that could accommodate up to 8,000 troops. Goodge Street continued in use as an army transit centre until it was damaged by fire on the night of 21 May 1956. The fire coincided with Parliamentary consideration of a Government Bill seeking power to take over the shelters (The Underground Works [London] Bill) and the Minister of Works assured the Commons they would not again be used for human occupation in peacetime (although no one was killed, the fire had caused some alarm and proved difficult to put out).

Another fire, on 21 June 1981, caused by burning rubbish, killed a man and injured 16 people, and resulted in a recommendation of a smoking ban on the Underground. There was a tardy response with London Transport finally introducing a one-year trial smoking ban on 9 July 1984. Almost halfway through the trial a major fire occurred at Oxford Circus, resulting in a full smoking ban on all subterranean stations and Underground trains.

== Design ==
It is one of the few tube stations that still rely on lifts rather than escalators to transport passengers to and from street level. In addition, it is one of the few such tube stations that still use the original scheme of separate exit and entrance areas. Alternatively, passengers can use the 138-step staircase to get down to the platforms. The surface building was designed by the Underground Electric Railways Company of London's (UERL's) architect Leslie Green.

== Services ==
Goodge Street station is on the Charing Cross branch of the Northern line in London fare zone 1. It is between Warren Street to the north and Tottenham Court Road to the south. Train frequencies vary throughout the day, but generally operate every 3–7 minutes in both directions.

| Preceding station | London Underground | Following station |
|---|---|---|
| Warren Street towards Edgware, Mill Hill East or High Barnet | Northern line Charing Cross branch | Tottenham Court Road towards Battersea Power Station, Morden or Kennington |

== Connections ==
Day and nighttime London Buses routes serve the station.

== In popular culture ==
The station appeared in the 1942 feature film Gert and Daisy's Weekend. The former shelter is the setting for much of the 1968 Doctor Who serial The Web of Fear. Dialogue in the story mentions the shelter's former use in the Second World War, and the exit in Chenies Street.

The station is the setting of the song "Sunny Goodge Street", from the 1965 album Fairytale by singer-songwriter Donovan. The station exterior also appeared in the 2005 music video for "Believe" by The Chemical Brothers.
