= St Paul's tube station =

London Underground station

St Paul's
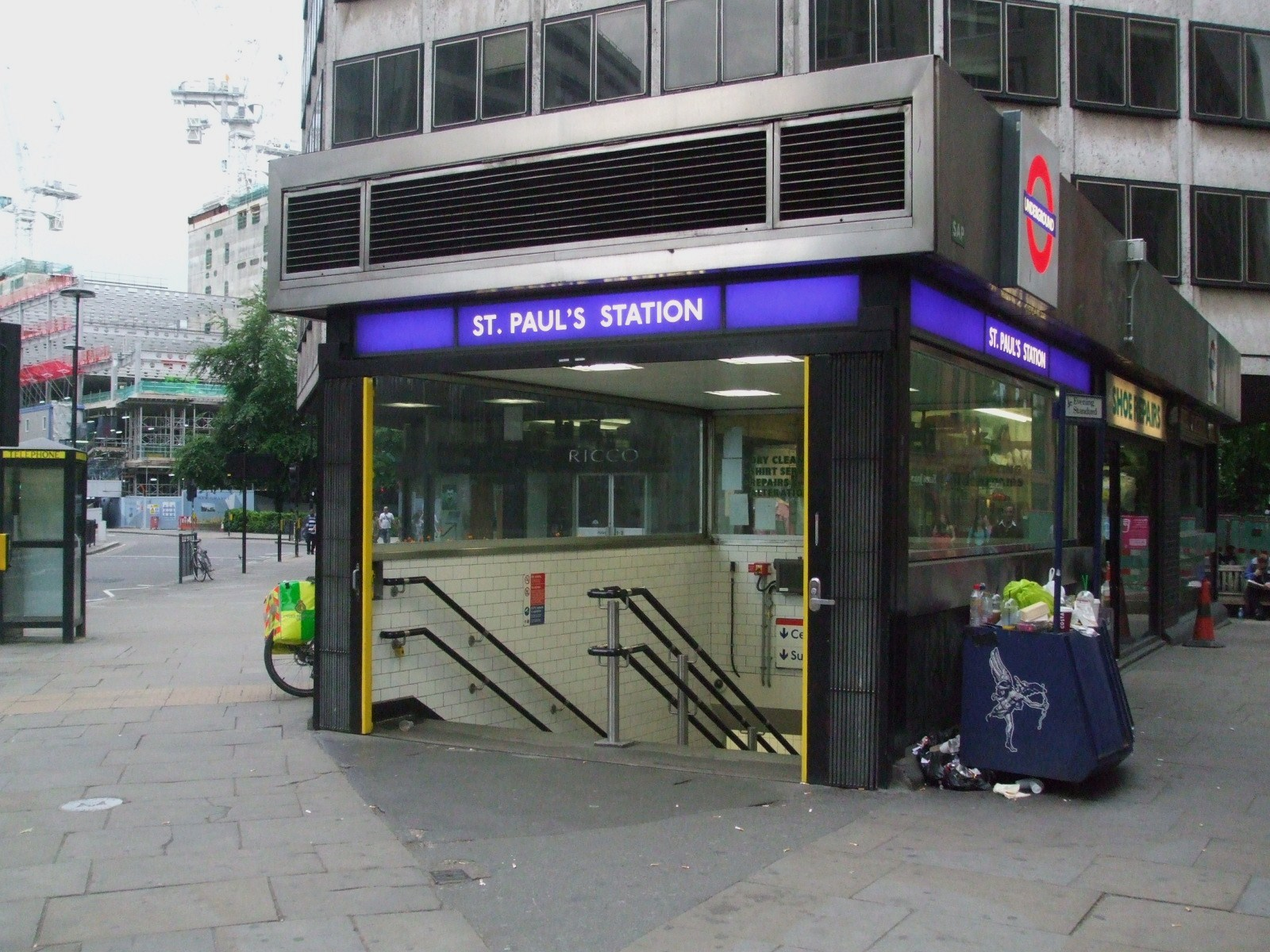
- Entrance to St Paul's (2009)
- Interactive map of St Paul's

General information
- Location: Smithfield
- Local authority: City of London
- Managed by: London Underground
- Number of platforms: 2
- Fare zone: 1
- OSI: City Thameslink

London Underground annual entry and exit
- 2020: ▼3.86 million
- 2021: ▲5.36 million
- 2022: ▲9.13 million
- 2023: ▲9.19 million
- 2024: ▲9.42 million

Railway companies
- Original company: Central London Railway

Key dates
- 30 July 1900: Opened as Post Office
- 1 February 1937: Renamed St. Paul's

Other information
- Coordinates: 51.5148°N 0.0975°W

St Paul's is a London Underground station. It is located in the City of London financial district. The station, which takes its name from the nearby St Paul's Cathedral, is on the Central line between Chancery Lane and Bank stations. It is in London fare zone 1.

It should not be confused with the former St. Paul's Thameslink railway station, a Thameslink railway station which opened in 1990, but has some distance from the Underground station. That station was subsequently renamed City Thameslink after one year, to avoid confusion for the emergency services. But for some years afterwards, many maps and guidebooks in circulation continued to carry the earlier name.

== History ==
The station was opened by the Central London Railway (CLR) on 30 July 1900 with the name Post Office, after the headquarters of the General Post Office on nearby St. Martin's Le Grand. The name Post Office was possibly chosen instead of the more obvious St. Paul's to differentiate it from a South Eastern Railway (SER) station which already held that name (but which today is called Blackfriars).

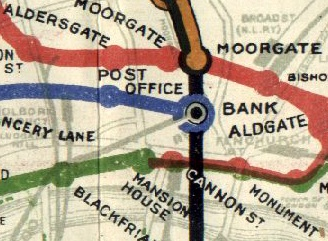
Post Office station on a 1908 Tube map, on the blue Central London Railway line.

The station entrance was originally located on the north side of Newgate Street, on the west side of the junction with King Edward Street, but was moved to the east when the station was modernised in the 1930s with an underground ticket hall and escalators. A modern ventilation shaft in the centre of the traffic island at the junction indicates the location of the original lift shafts. When the SER station called St. Paul's was renamed as Blackfriars in 1937, the Underground station called Post Office took the name St. Paul's, which it has kept ever since.

At the end of the 19th century, Newgate Street was a narrow road with some of its medieval character remaining. To reduce land purchase and compensation payments, the CLR routed its tunnels directly under public roads. At St. Paul's the narrowness of the road required the tunnels to be placed one above the other with the westbound tunnel uppermost. The lifts originally operated to a level between the two platforms, with stairs up or down to the platforms as necessary. A high-level access passageway is visible at the lowest level leading to the disused lift lobby.

During the Second World War the electricity grid control room for London and Southeast England was housed below ground in the lift shaft.

== The station today ==
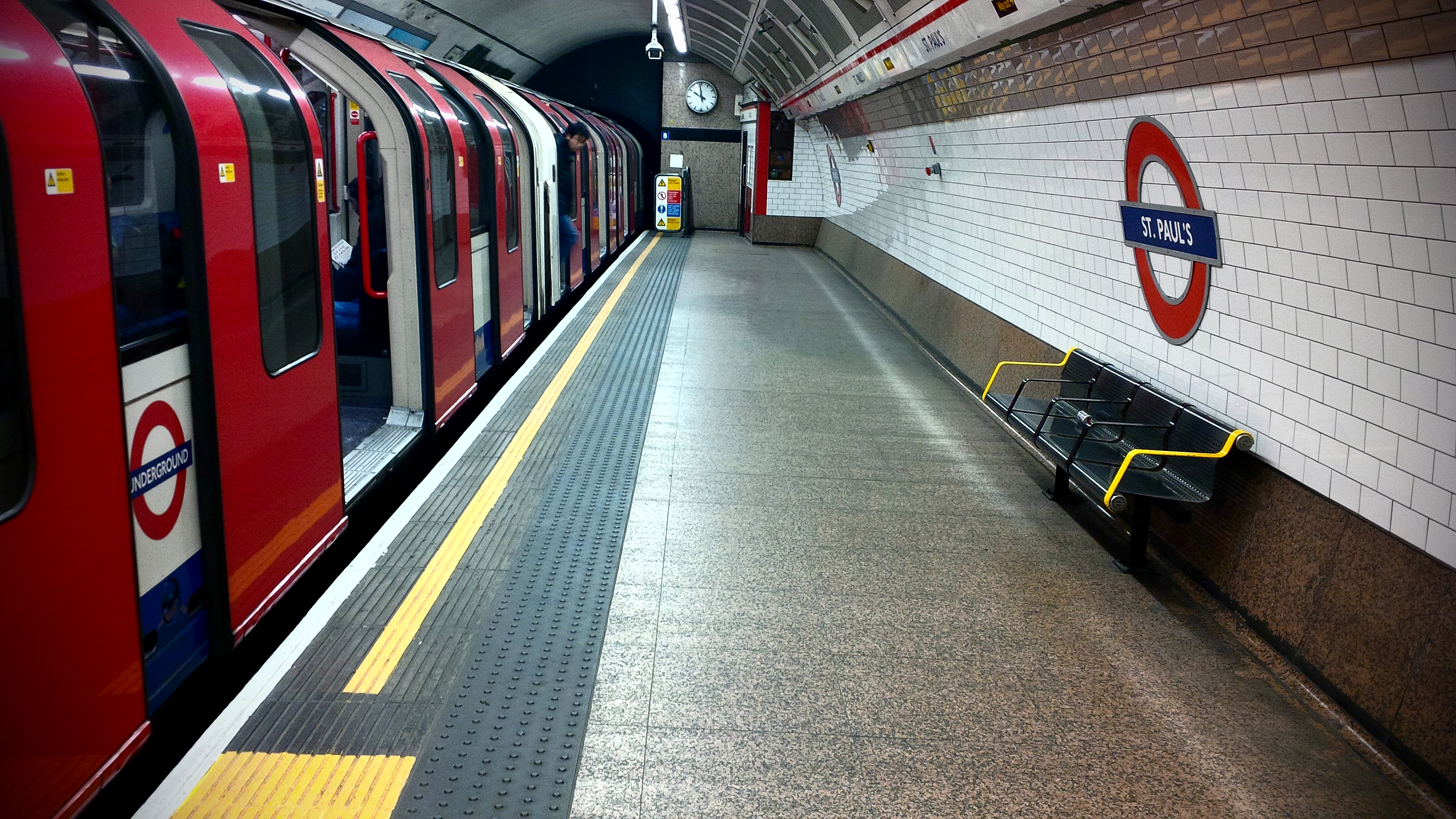
A Central line train on the westbound platform

The station entrances are located around the junction of Newgate Street, Cheapside and St. Martin's Le Grand. St Paul's Cathedral is a short distance to the south. The main entrance to the cathedral is at its western end, a few minutes' walk away.

St Paul's is also the nearest Underground station to the London Stock Exchange and One New Change. Other notable sites in the vicinity include the Old Bailey, Museum of London and the church of St Mary-le-Bow.

== Connections ==
London Buses routes 4, 8, 25, 56, 76, 100, 133 and night routes N8, N25 and N242 serve the station.

== Future proposals ==
An underground passageway linking City Thameslink railway station to St Paul's tube station to provide an interchange between the Central line and National Rail services on the Thameslink railway has been suggested by London TravelWatch in a report in 2014, which suggested it would benefit passengers travelling from the Central line to Gatwick and Luton Airports.

== Notes ==
Preceding station	London Underground	Following station
Chancery Lane towards Ealing Broadway or West Ruislip	Central line	Bank towards Epping, Hainault or Woodford via Newbury Park
