= Chancery Lane tube station =

London Underground station

Chancery Lane
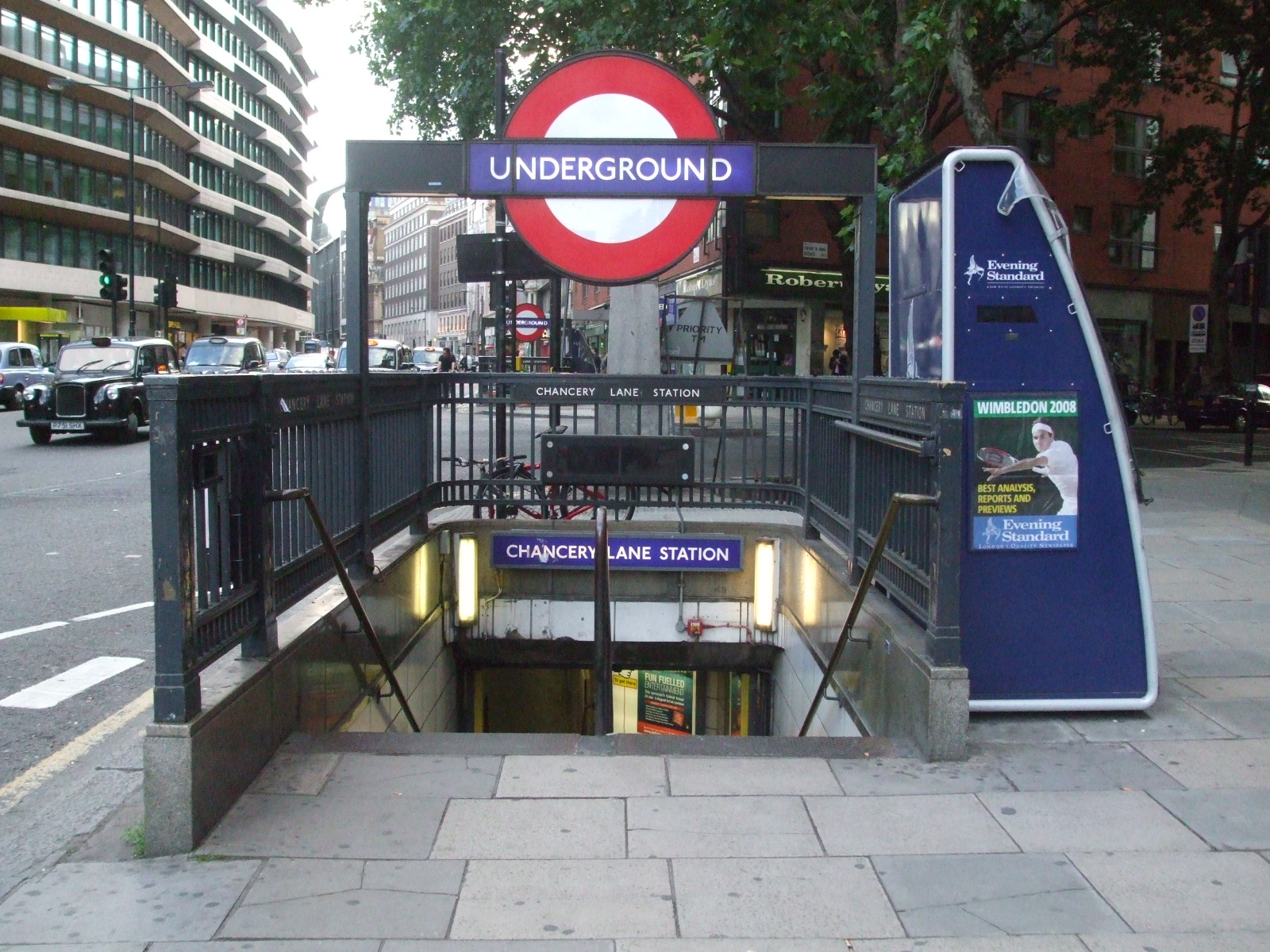
- Northeastern entrance
- Interactive map of Chancery Lane

General information
- Location: Holborn
- Local authority: City of London; London Borough of Camden
- Managed by: London Underground
- Owner: Transport for London
- Number of platforms: 2
- Fare zone: 1

London Underground annual entry and exit
- 2020: ▼3.41 million
- 2021: ▲5.47 million
- 2022: ▲8.53 million
- 2023: ▼7.80 million
- 2024: ▲8.72 million

Key dates
- 30 July 1900: Opened

Other information
- External links: TfL station info page
- Coordinates: 51.518°N 0.111°W

Chancery Lane (/ˈtʃɑːnsəri ˈleɪn/) is a London Underground station. It is on the Central line between Holborn and St Paul's stations, and is in London fare zone 1. The station has entrances within both the London Borough of Camden and the City of London. It opened in 1900 and takes its name from the nearby Chancery Lane.

The station is located at the junction of High Holborn, Hatton Garden and Gray's Inn Road, with subway entrances giving access to the ticket office under the roadway. Chancery Lane is one of the few London Underground stations which have no associated buildings above ground.

== History ==
The station was opened by the Central London Railway (CLR) on 30 July 1900. The current station entrance is not the original. The original, disused station building is on the north side of High Holborn at Nos. 31–33, approximately 400 feet (122 m) to the west, closer to High Holborn's junction with Chancery Lane. Originally provided with four lifts between ground and platform levels, the station was rebuilt in the early 1930s to operate with escalators. It was not possible to construct the inclined escalator shaft between the platforms and the existing entrance, so a new sub-surface ticket hall was constructed below the road junction. The new station entrance came into use on 25 June 1934. The old entrance building became redundant and, in recognition of the location of the new entrance, the station was renamed Chancery Lane (Gray's Inn), although the suffix subsequently fell out of use.

When the CLR excavated the running tunnels it routed them to avoid passing under surface buildings in order to limit the risk to the buildings from vibration. At Chancery Lane, the eastbound tunnel runs above the westbound one.

It is one of eight Underground stations with a deep-level air-raid shelter underneath it; after World War II this was turned into Kingsway telephone exchange. Access to the shelter was via the original station building and lift shaft as well as subsidiary entrances in Furnival Street and Took's Court.

== Accidents and incidents ==
On 25 January 2003, a 1992 Stock train derailed at Chancery Lane, injuring 32 passengers, after a motor became detached from the train. All services on the entire Central line and the Waterloo & City line (which used the same type of train) were suspended, as the trains had to be taken out of service whilst the cause of the failure was determined and appropriate modifications made to the trains.

== Connections ==
London Buses routes and night routes serve the station.

Preceding station	London Underground	Following station
Holborn towards Ealing Broadway or West Ruislip	Central line	St Paul's towards Epping, Hainault or Woodford via Newbury Park
Former service
British Museum towards Ealing Broadway	Central line (1900–1933)	Post Office towards Liverpool Street
