= Secrets of the London Underground =

British factual UKTV documentary series

- Genre: Factual
- Presented by: Tim Dunn; Siddy Holloway
- Country of origin: United Kingdom
- No. of series: 4
- No. of episodes: 36

Production
- Executive producer: Rob Dersley
- Running time: 44 minutes
- Production company: Brown Bob Productions

Original release
- Network: Yesterday / UKTV
- Release: 19 July 2021 – 3 September 2024

Secrets of the London Underground is a British factual documentary series presented by railway historian Tim Dunn and London Transport Museum's Engagement Manager Siddy Holloway, co-developer of 'Hidden London', the museum's programme of tours that gives visitors access to disused and historical parts of the network.

Secrets of the London Underground was first broadcast in the United Kingdom from 19 July 2021 on Yesterday. The series explores hidden areas of the London Underground such as abandoned tunnels, secret bunkers and hidden staircases, and delves into the archives of the London Transport Museum's Acton Depot. The format of the programme generally centres around visiting two abandoned areas of the London Underground, in addition to viewing some of the Museum's collection at Acton, usually with assistant director and 'Hidden London' co-developer Chris Nix.

The first programme opened with 388,300 viewers and a 2.7% share, the highest rated programme on Yesterday and the 5th most watched non-public service broadcast programme that week.

The series is a UKTV original, commissioned for Yesterday and produced by Brown Bob Productions, following on from the success of Dunn's previous UKTV series The Architecture the Railways Built. Jacqueline Hewer, CEO of the programme's production company, stated "We can promise one thing - you'll never travel on the tube again without wondering what's through that door at the end of the platform..." UKTV's Hilary Rosen, deputy director of commissioning, described the series as "Viewers are fascinated by the Tube and this series promises unseen locations, fresh stories and secrets galore from right across the city."

After 659,000 viewers watched the first series, making it Yesterday's highest rated programme ever, the show was recommissioned for a second series of ten episodes, which was broadcast between May and July 2022. A third series of ten episodes was broadcast between July and September 2023.

A fourth series of ten episodes was commissioned in February 2024 and broadcast between July and September 2024.

== Episodes ==
=== Series 1 ===
Episode	Original air date	Programme title	Programme summary
1	19 July 2021	Holborn	The abandoned Piccadilly branch line between Holborn & Aldwych, and a spiral escalator at Holloway Road. At the depot, Tim explores some of the tube's iconic artwork and meets the man who drove the last Aldwych train.
2	26 July 2021	North End	The Cold War bunker at North End, under Hampstead Heath, and floodgates at Embankment. At the depot, they rifle through the original drawings for North End and discover plans for the floodgates at London’s riverside stations.
3	2 August 2021	Piccadilly	Disused parts of Piccadilly Circus and Highgate surface station. At the depot, Tim finds out about London Underground's iconic signs and special typeface.
4	9 August 2021	Euston	Hidden parts of Euston including the areas set for demolition for HS2 and a signalling cabin at York Road. At the depot, they learn about ventilation and signalling.
5	16 August 2021	St Mary's	A night-time track walk along forgotten District line stations St Mary's and Aldgate East, and disused parts of Oxford Circus.
6	23 August 2021	Clapham	Clapham South deep level air raid shelter used during the Second World War and the remains of the Greathead tunnelling shield at Moorgate. At the depot, they discover an original London Transport recipe book.

=== Series 2 ===
Episode	Original air date	Programme title	Programme summary
1	5 May 2022	Charing Cross	The disused Jubilee line areas of Charing Cross, the service tunnels that were dug under Trafalgar Square to help with the Jubilee line's construction and the Kennington Loop. At the depot, Tim looks at some original plans for other loops elsewhere on the network.
2	12 May 2022	Waterloo & City	The Waterloo & City line, along the tunnel towards Bank, and the abandoned Mark Lane. At the depot, Tim looks at the museum's collection of unscanned photos and learns about the Underground's moquette.
3	19 May 2022	King William Street and Knightsbridge	King William Street, the earliest disused station on the tube and Knightsbridge’s lifts. At the depot, Tim looks at the museum's contemporary collection.
4	26 May 2022	Brompton Road and St Pauls	Piccadilly line night walk to explore the hidden Second World War remains of Brompton Road, and an unexpected wartime use for St Pauls. At the depot, Tim meets a woman who sheltered inside Hampstead tube station during air raids.
5	2 June 2022	London Bridge and Ongar	Disused parts of London Bridge, Ongar and Blake Hall on the withdrawn section of the Central line. At the depot, Tim looks at the museum's poster archive.
6	9 June 2022	King's Cross and Marlborough Road	A secret siding and disused Thameslink platforms at Kings Cross, and disused Marlborough Road on the Metropolitan line. At the depot, Tim looks at a 1904 carriage and discovers the history of the Victoria line's automatic trains.
7	16 June 2022	Elizabeth Line and Angel	Unopened Elizabeth line stations and disused parts of Angel. At the depot, Tim learns how waste heat from Northern line trains is being used.
8	23 June 2022	Quainton Road and Kingsway	Quainton Road, once on the Metropolitan line, and the Kingsway tramway tunnel. At the depot, Tim looks at the history behind the Underground map.
9	30 June 2022	Greenwich and Notting Hill	Greenwich Power Station, a standby power station for the London Underground, and hidden parts of Notting Hill Gate. At the depot, Tim learns about ticketing.
10	7 July 2022	Baker Street and Edgware Road	Baker Street, the underground station with the most platforms, and the disused Edgware Road signal cabin. At the depot, Tim looks at the history of the Lost Property Office and London Transport's post-war catering operation.

=== Series 3 ===
Episode	Original air date	Programme title	Programme summary
1	4 July 2023	Camden	Hidden passages of Camden Town station on the Northern line and platform pubs and hidden rivers at Sloane Square station on the District line. At the depot, Tim learns about the forgotten seasonal service to Southend and is introduced to the Q stock restoration project.
2	11 July 2023	South Kensington	South Kensington station on the District, Circle and Piccadilly lines and Marylebone station on the Bakerloo line. At the depot, Tim learns how the Underground became a lifeline for an immigrant family from the Punjab and discovers the true colours of the Tube lines.
3	18 July 2023	Green Park	Wartime underground bunkers of Green Park station, formerly Dover Street, on the Jubilee, Piccadilly and Victoria lines and disused Down Street station on the Piccadilly line. At the depot, Tim learns about the wartime bunker canteens and explores plans with Chris Nix.
4	25 July 2023	British Museum	The abandoned British Museum station on the Central line and on the District and Circle lines, Bayswater station and the false houses of Leinster Gardens. At the depot, Tim discovers some of the ways women have been encouraged to use the underground from the museum's poster store.
5	1 August 2023	West Ashfield & Oval	A visit to West Ashfield training facility and the history of Oval station on the Northern line. At the depot, Tim learns about the experimental tube train designs of the 1930s and 1980s.
6	8 August 2023	Leicester Square	The history of Leicester Square station in London's Theatreland and exploration of disused areas of Hyde Park Corner station. At the depot, Tim sees some theatre-themed station posters and the evolution of station clock designs.
7	15 August 2023	Heathrow	The Heathrow Airport stations, the historic Swiss Cottage station and a train driver simulator at the London Transport Museum. At the depot, Tim talks to artist Mark Wallinger about his Labyrinth project to commemorate the Tube's 150th anniversary.
8	22 August 2023	Shepherd's Bush	Shepherd's Bush station, Elephant & Castle station and an interview with a female train-driver. At the depot, Tim learns more about the Art on the Underground project and rides in a Unimog road–rail hybrid shunter.
9	29 August 2023	Acton Works	The large Acton Works engineering facility and the former South Acton / Acton Town shuttle service. At the depot, Tim inspects the innovative 38 Stock and learns about the Tube's energy-efficiency plans.
10	5 September 2023	Archway	The history and hidden areas of Archway station in north London, station ventilation systems and the Emergency Response Unit. At the depot, Tim is shown safety equipment and sees some of the museum's modern acquisitions.

=== Series 4 ===
Episode	Original air date	Programme title	Programme summary
1	2 July 2024	Earls Court and Alperton	Tim and Siddy explore Earl's Court station – a busy interchange on the Piccadilly and District lines. It was the very first station to have a passenger escalator and the first to have automatic lifts. Tim discovers how a recent re-design of the walkways was created to fit in with its glass roof. Siddy visits Alperton towards the western end of the Piccadilly Line; it is an example of the work of the London Underground architect, Charles Holden, with a design which was regarded as futuristic when it was built in the 1930s.
2	9 July 2024	Paddington & Tottenham Court Road	Tim and Siddy go under the platforms of Paddington station. There are five different tube lines running through it, with the oldest and newest lines opening 150 years apart.Tim explores a tunnel still in use under the mainline station, with intriguing clues as to its original purpose. Siddy discovers some former police cells underneath the platforms, and unearths what remains of the luggage carousels from when passengers on the Heathrow Express were allowed to check-in their luggage in the main station. At Tottenham Court Road, Siddy reveals the huge changes to the station to accommodate the Elizabeth line, and tells the story of how the station's mosaic artwork was preserved during the works. She also reveals a floodgate installed as part of Britain's Cold War defences.
3	16 July 2024	Waterloo & Marble Arch	Tim and Siddy explore the forgotten tunnels underneath one of Britain's busiest main line stations.
4	23 July 2024	South Kentish Town & London Underground Control Centre	Tim Dunn and Siddy Holloway get exclusive access to the disused station at South Kentish Town.
5	30 July 2024	Thames Tunnel & Lambeth North	Tim Dunn and Siddy Holloway explore the very first tunnel under the Thames.
6	6 August 2024	Ruislip Depot & Warren Street	Tim and Siddy get privileged access to the vast maintenance depot at Ruislip, at the end of the Central line. It's the nerve-centre for all that takes place on the tube, from routine track repairs to emergency engineering. Tim gets a demonstration of how tracks are replaced, as a crane lifts huge pre-assembled sections of railway track into place. Siddy gets in the driving seat of a machine that moves ballast into place under sleepers to hold the track in position. At Warren Street, on the Northern and Victoria lines, Siddy explores the station's constant reinvention. It first opened in the early 1900s, was remodelled in the 1930s and then had a massive make-over in the 60s when the Victoria line arrived. At the Museum depot in Acton, Tim meets a poet who has had her work chosen to appear as part of the ‘Poems on the Underground’ series.
7	13 August 2024	Northumberland Park & Finsbury Park	Tim and Siddy get access to the maintenance depot at Northumberland Park, responsible for looking after the entire fleet of Victoria Line trains. Tim meets the team checking all the carriages, and sees the incredible precision needed to finely shave the metal wheels to keep them running smoothly on the tracks. Siddy checks the vintage control panel on the tower and finds it is still in working order whilst Tim visits the Control Centre responsible for running the line on a day to day basis. They ride on the private service that links the depot with Seven Sisters station alighting at its mysterious third platform. At Finsbury Park station on the Victoria and Piccadilly lines, Siddy does a night-time track walk to access the now-disused tunnel which was part of an early experiment to run large electric mainline trains on the tube. At our Museum Tim hears about the importance of design across the tube network, and looks at the bespoke designs for seating fabric across different underground lines.
8	20 August 2024	Stockwell & DLR	Explores the rich history of Stockwell station on the Victoria Line. It was originally the terminus station for the City and South London Railway – the first ever deep level electric tube railway in the world, and the birth of the tube as we know it. Tim finds evidence of a deep level shelter used by Londoners during the Second World War. On the platforms, he reveals something rather more contemporary – the tiles depicting a swan in homage to a local pub. As Siddy descends deep into the station, she finds metallic tiles on the walls and cast iron segments in a disused lift shaft, each crucial relics of their era. Siddy visits the main depot for the DLR. She hears how they're developing new technology to alert them to any passengers on the tracks. And she gets a preview of their new fleet of trains currently on test runs along the network. At the Museum depot, Tim explores the items in their collection charting the history of the DLR, including models of the original 1986 trains.
9	27 August 2024	Gloucester Road	Tim and Siddy meet at Gloucester Road in London's museum quarter – a station serving the Circle, District and Piccadilly lines. It was built as two separate stations, with the earliest, grander section opening in the 1860s. Tim finds an original footbridge still overlooking the modern platforms, as well as a hidden space where you can still see the brickwork of the early tunnels. Siddy explores the later station – a Leslie Green design built in the early 1900s with original tiles and remains of the lifts still in evidence. Tim and Siddy also explore the now-disused platform that's been turned into an art gallery. Siddy leaves London to visit Goole in Yorkshire where 70 new Piccadilly line trains are being assembled. She gets a tour of the factory and is allowed on board a new open-plan carriage, being fitted with air conditioning.
10	3 September 2024	Old Street	Explores the unusual station at Old Street. It serves both the Northern line and mainline trains, and they discover how the platforms and tunnels differ across the two different services. The station has undergone massive changes since it first opened in 1901, and there's still plenty of evidence of its early years, if you know where to look. Tim goes through a tiny doorway to discover a hidden passage with an original fully-tiled vaulted ceiling. Siddy discovers a staircase last used in the 1920s, which still has the original sign showing the Northern Line tube stops. Siddy visits Hampstead, the deepest station below ground on the entire Underground network. Unsurprisingly, it also has the deepest lift shaft, and she gets to ride on top of the lift to see the record-breaking 55-metre shaft up close. At our Museum depot, Tim meets the first ever female driver on the Victoria line. She talks about working on the tube in the 1970s.
