= The Bunch of Grapes, Knightsbridge =

Listed pub in London, England

The Bunch of Grapes
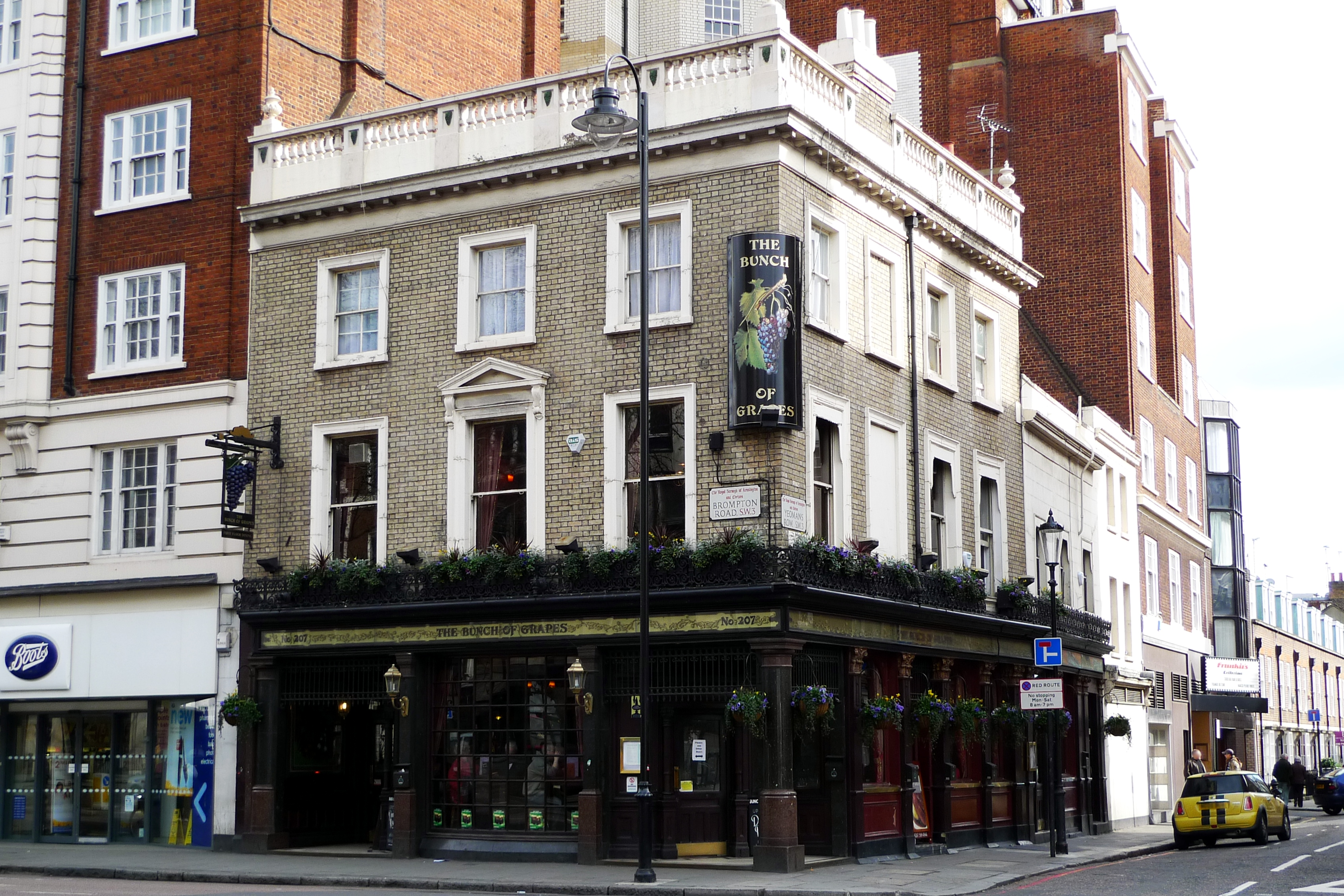
- The pub in 2009

- Location within Royal Borough of Kensington and Chelsea Location within Greater London

General information
- Type: Public house
- Location: 207 Brompton Road, Knightsbridge, London, England
- Coordinates: 51.497489°N 0.167058°W
- Year built: Mid-19th century
- Renovated: Late 19th century (refurbished)
- Owner: Greene King

Design and construction
- Designations

Listed Building – Grade II
- Official name: The Bunch of Grapes public house
- Designated: 7 November 1984
- Reference no.: 1358124

Website
- Official website

The Bunch of Grapes is a Grade II listed pub on Brompton Road in Knightsbridge, London, England. Built in the mid-19th century, and recorded by the Campaign for Real Ale (CAMRA) as dating from 1844–45, it retains a largely intact interior resulting from a late Victorian refurbishment. The pub is included on CAMRA's National Inventory of Historic Pub Interiors, where it is awarded a three-star rating and recognised for its interior of "outstanding national historic importance".

== History ==
The public house was constructed in the mid-19th century, according to its official listing. The Campaign for Real Ale (CAMRA) records a date of 1844–45. Much of its surviving interior derives from a late Victorian refurbishment. Decorative painted mirrors signed and dated 1890, together with other fittings and partitions, survive from this period.

On 7 November 1984, the Bunch of Grapes was designated a Grade II listed building. It is regarded by CAMRA as having an interior of "outstanding national historic importance" and is rated three stars on its National Inventory of Historic Pub Interiors. As of September 2026, the freehold was owned by Greene King.

== Architecture ==
=== Exterior ===
The building is faced in yellow brick and stucco and has three storeys, with a frontage of three window bays. A longer side elevation extends to the right, incorporating a two-storey, three-bay wing. The ground floor frontage is supported by granite pillars, which may be later additions. The side elevation includes painted stucco pilasters with Corinthian capitals. The windows are framed by decorative surrounds, and the central first-floor window is topped by a pediment. Above the second floor is a projecting cornice, surmounted by a balustrade with finials. A cast-iron balcony runs across the first floor.

=== Interior ===
Much of the interior dates from a late Victorian refurbishment. Surviving features include a series of back-painted mirrors depicting vines, flowers, birds and other plant motifs. Several are signed by W. James of Kentish Town and dated 1890.

The servery occupies a central position within the pub. Fragments of partitions survive at the front of the building, indicating that the interior was formerly divided into separate drinking areas. Additional sections of partitioning remain on the left and rear-right sides, while a former passage giving access to a rear bar has also been suggested.

A row of five glazed screens beside the servery is decorated with birds and grape clusters. The area is also distinguished by carved timberwork featuring grape motifs. Other historic fittings include cast-iron columns with decorative capitals, etched glass, a window bearing the inscription "Bottles & Jug", and an entrance vestibule at the front right.

The island bar-back largely dates from the Victorian period, although it has been altered and much of the original lower shelving has been replaced by refrigeration equipment. Decorative plasterwork survives above the fitting, while elements of the bar counter appear to date from the early 20th century.
