= The Architecture the Railways Built =

British television documentary series

- Genre: Factual
- Presented by: Tim Dunn
- Country of origin: United Kingdom
- No. of series: 4
- No. of episodes: 40

Production
- Running time: 44 minutes
- Production company: Brown Bob Productions

Original release
- Network: Yesterday / UKTV
- Release: 28 April 2020 – 2 May 2023

The Architecture the Railways Built is a British factual documentary series presented by the historian Tim Dunn, first broadcast in the United Kingdom from 28 April 2020 on Yesterday. Each episode explores railway sites across the UK and Europe, including historical, abandoned, modern and future elements. All episodes in series 1 to 3 have one featured location from continental Europe; the rest of the featured locations in each episode are from the United Kingdom.

The series is a UKTV original, commissioned for Yesterday and produced by Brown Bob Productions. Two further series of ten episodes each were commissioned by UKTV in October 2020, with the sequel premiering on 19 January 2021, and the third series premiering on 13 September 2021. A fourth series was commissioned in 2022, with the first of ten episodes broadcast on 28 February 2023.

From 4 February 2025, BBC Four began showing series 1 each weekday evening except Friday.

Following its success, Secrets of the London Underground, a programme of four series presented by Dunn, was broadcast from 2021.

== Episodes ==
Series	Episodes	Originally released	
Series	Episodes	First released	Last released
1	10	28 April 2020	30 June 2020
2	10	19 January 2021	23 March 2021
3	10	13 September 2021	15 November 2021
4	10	28 February 2023	2 May 2023

=== Series 1 (2020) ===
No. overall	No. in series	Title	Featured locations	Original release date
1	1	"Down Street"	Down Street tube station; Rotterdam Centraal station; Bennerley Viaduct	28 April 2020
2	2	"Ffestiniog"	Ffestiniog Railway; Amsterdam Centraal station; The Landmark Hotel, Marylebone	5 May 2020
3	3	"King's Cross"	King's Cross station; Clifton Rocks Railway; Dartmouth station; Göltzsch Viaduct	12 May 2020
4	4	"Ribblehead"	Ribblehead Viaduct; Settle–Carlisle line; Surbiton station; Hungerburgbahn	19 May 2020
5	5	"Metroland"	Metro-land; Great Malvern station; Glacier Express	26 May 2020
6	6	"St Pancras"	St Pancras station; Midland Grand Hotel; Castle Howard station; Stoosbahn	2 June 2020
7	7	"Snowdon"	Snowdon Mountain Railway; Hafod Eryri; Severn Bridge Junction signal box; Strasbourg-Ville station	9 June 2020
8	8	"Broadway"	55 Broadway; Helsinki Central station; Wolferton station; Barmouth Bridge	16 June 2020
9	9	"Stockton Darlington"	Stockton and Darlington Railway; Hitachi Newton Aycliffe; Chappel Viaduct; Stockholm Metro	23 June 2020
10	10	"Swindon"	Swindon railway village; Jubilee Line Extension; Milano Centrale station	30 June 2020

=== Series 2 (2021) ===
No. overall	No. in series	Title	Featured locations	Original release date
11	1	"Wemyss Bay"	Wemyss Bay station; Blackfriars station; São Bento station	19 January 2021
12	2	"Royal Albert Bridge"	Royal Albert Bridge; Saltash station; Wolverhampton Low and High Level stations; Gällivare station	26 January 2021
13	3	"Windsor"	Connel Bridge; Windsor & Eton Central and Riverside stations; Gniezno locomotive depot	2 February 2021
14	4	"Piccadilly Line"	Piccadilly line Extension; Plzeň station; Causey Arch	9 February 2021
15	5	"Lynton"	Lynton and Lynmouth Cliff Railway; Lynton and Barnstaple Railway; Catesby Tunnel; Leipzig station	16 February 2021
16	6	"Barrow Hill"	Barrow Hill Roundhouse; Bath Green Park and Bath Spa stations; Łódź Fabryczna station	23 February 2021
17	7	"Sheffield"	Sheffield station; Bennerley Viaduct (revisit); Lisbon Orient station	2 March 2021
18	8	"Bristol"	Bristol Temple Meads station; Southend Pier Railway; Haapsalu station	9 March 2021
19	9	"Huddersfield"	Huddersfield station; Hohenzollern Bridge; Midland Hotel; Morecambe Promenade station	16 March 2021
20	10	"Wingfield"	Wingfield station; Welland Viaduct; Malmö Central station and City Tunnel	23 March 2021

=== Series 3 (2021) ===
No. overall	No. in series	Title	Featured locations	Original release date
21	1	"Newcastle"	Newcastle Central station and High Level Bridge; Ballochmyle and Laigh Milton Viaducts; Oberweißbacher Bergbahn	13 September 2021
22	2	"Wharncliffe"	Wharncliffe Viaduct; Three Bridges; Ballater station; Rossio station; Brentford Dock	20 September 2021
23	3	"Charing Cross"	Charing Cross station; Hungerford Bridge; Borås Central station; Ordsall Chord	27 September 2021
24	4	"Bramhope Tunnel"	Bramhope Tunnel; Dresden Hauptbahnhof; Fawley Hill	4 October 2021
25	5	"Saltburn"	Saltburn-by-the-Sea; Brislington tram depot; Aleksandrów Kujawski station	11 October 2021
26	6	"Bishopstone"	Bishopstone station; Stockholm Central station; Selby Diversion	18 October 2021
27	7	"Greenwich"	London and Greenwich Railway; Žampach Viaduct; Alnwick station	25 October 2021
28	8	"North Staffordshire"	North Staffordshire Railway Company and Stoke station; Byker Viaduct; Elbląg Canal	1 November 2021
29	9	"Ramsgate"	Margate and Ramsgate stations; Dom Luís I Bridge; Mail Rail	8 November 2021
30	10	"Curzon Street"	Birmingham Curzon Street Station; Copenhagen Metro; Bekonscot model village	15 November 2021

=== Series 4 (2023) ===
No. overall	No. in series	Title	Featured locations	Original release date
31	1	"Forth Bridge"	Forth Rail Bridge; Euston Arch; Goathland station	28 February 2023
32	2	"Manchester"	Castlefield Viaduct; Manchester Oxford Road and Manchester Mayfield stations; National Railway Museum; Reading Station	7 March 2023
33	3	"Channel Tunnel"	Channel Tunnel; Ashford International; National Railway Museum; Folkestone Harbour station	14 March 2023
34	4	"London Bridge"	London Bridge station; National Railway Museum; Knaresborough Viaduct and station	21 March 2023
35	5	"Coventry"	Coventry station; Scarborough funiculars; Network Rail Archives	28 March 2023
36	6	"Edinburgh"	Goole railway swing bridge; Edinburgh Waverley station	4 April 2023
37	7	"Lincoln"	Lincoln station; Lincoln St. Marks station; Birmingham New Street signal box; Network Rail Archives	11 April 2023
38	8	"South Devon"	Starcross engine house; South Devon sea wall; Wingfield station (revisit); National Railway Museum; Meldon Viaduct; Okehampton station	18 April 2023
39	9	"Leeds"	Hunslet Engine Company; Middleton Railway; National Railway Museum; Neville Hill; Halifax station	25 April 2023
40	10	"Hull"	Hull Paragon station; Network Rail Archives; Leamington Spa station; Hull Victoria Pier station	2 May 2023

== Reception ==
The critical reception of the first series of The Architecture the Railways Built in 2020 was notably warm. The Guardian, reviewing the opening episode on 28 April, called it "enjoyable and illuminating stuff, highlighting Tim Dunn's enthusiasm and the programme's ability to reveal the surprisingly striking architecture associated with railways. Later in the series, the paper remained complimentary: Hannah Verdier described Dunn as exceptionally enthusiastic about train travel and said he continued to spread "railway magic" through his visits to historic structures. Radio Times was similarly enthusiastic: its TV editor Alison Graham described the programme as one of her "lockdown treats" and said simply, "I love the series".

The reviews therefore tended to value the programme less as a specialist railway documentary than as an accessible combination of architectural history, engineering and enthusiastic travelogue. Dunn’s conspicuous enthusiasm was repeatedly treated as an asset rather than an eccentricity, helping make fairly specialist subjects approachable to a general audience. Contemporary railway coverage echoed that assessment: World of Railways characterised the first series as a "critical and ratings success", while The Railway Magazine emphasised the programme's decision to turn attention away from locomotives towards the often-overlooked buildings and civil engineering of the railway landscape.
