= Tim Dunn (historian) =

TV presenter & railway enthusiast (born 1981)

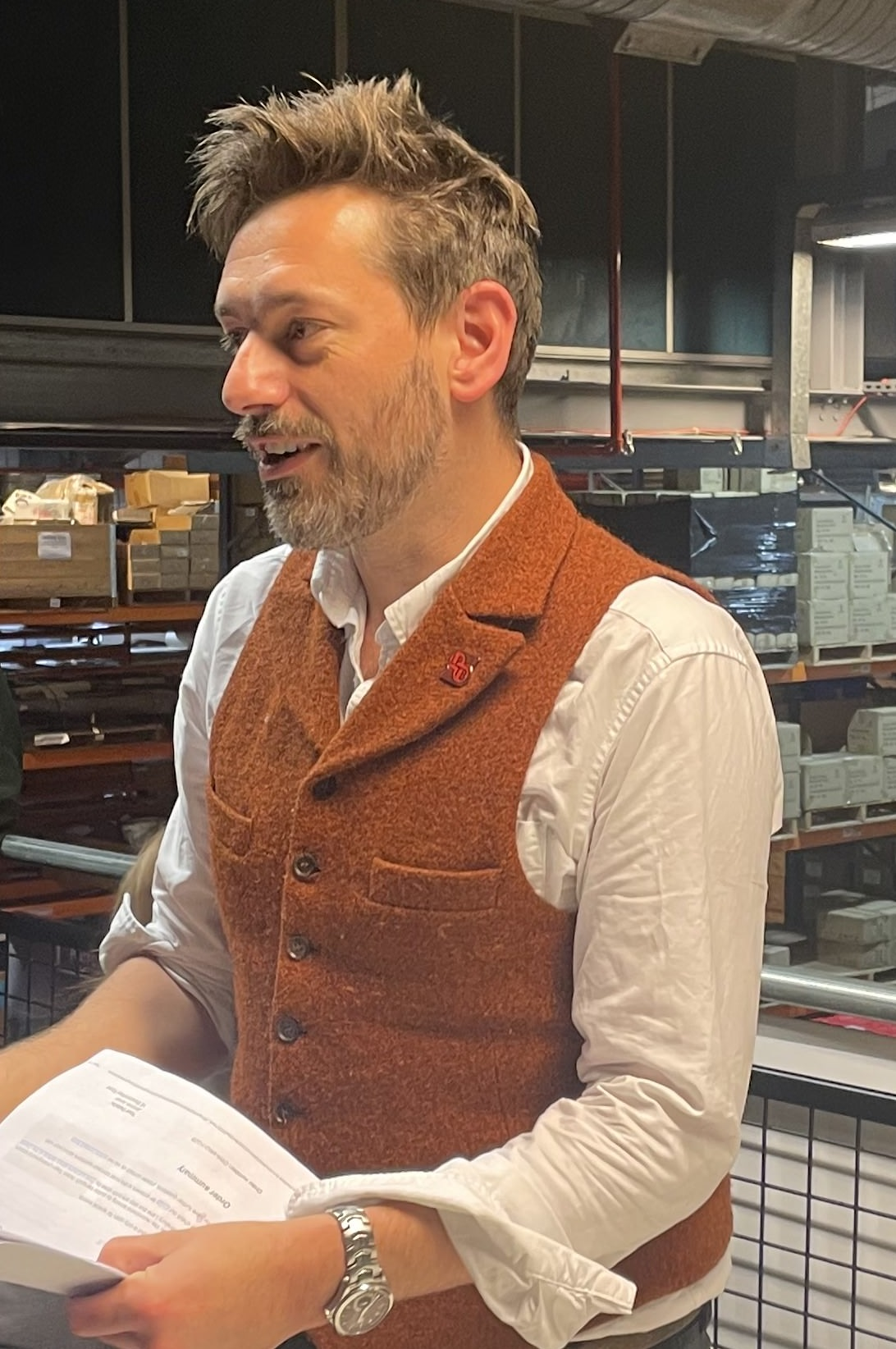
- Born: 26 March 1981 (age 45)
- Education: University of Exeter
- Occupations: Travel editor, historian, presenter
- Notable work: The Architecture the Railways Built; Trainspotting Live; Secrets of the London Underground

Tim Dunn (born 26 March 1981) is a British railway historian, model railway enthusiast, TV presenter, geographer and travel editor. Dunn is known for his presenting and writing work, primarily on rail transport and architecture. He has previously worked as a travel editor and customer relations campaign manager for the transportation website Trainline.

== Personal life ==
Dunn grew up in Chalfont St Peter, Buckinghamshire and was introduced to railways at an early age by his grandparents and worked at the local Bekonscot model village as a teenager. He trained as a historical geographer, and in addition to broadcasting, he has curated museum exhibitions, been a museum trustee, and is on the advisory panel of the UK's Railway Heritage Trust. He currently lives in London with his boyfriend, an architectural historian.

== Filmography ==
Television roles
Year	Title	Role	Notes
2016	Trainspotting Live	Presenter	
2017	Britain's Greatest Invention	Self	
2018	Trains that Changed the World	Self - Railway historian	5 episodes
2019	Secrets of the Railways	Self - Railway historian	5 episodes
2020–present	The Architecture the Railways Built	Presenter	Ongoing, lead presenter
2021–present	Secrets of the London Underground	Presenter	Ongoing

== Published works ==
Dunn is a contributor on railways and architecture to a number of publications such as RAIL, The Railway Magazine and Londonist, and has also published some standalone works.

- Dunn, Tim (15 November 2017). Model Villages. Amberley Publishing. ISBN 9781445669144.
