= Knightsbridge =

District in central London, England

Coordinates: 51.5017°N 0.1621°W

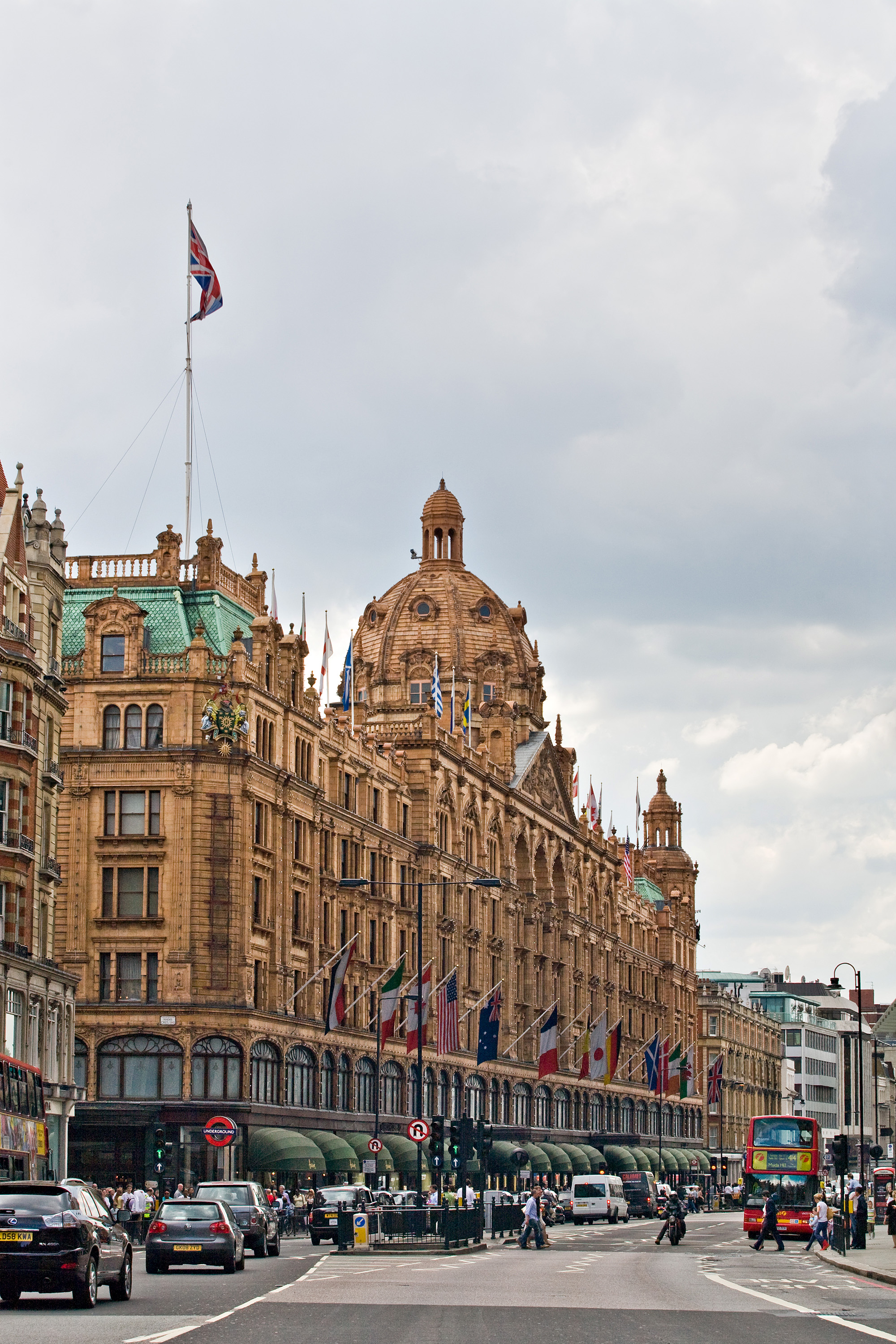
- Harrods on Brompton Road

- Location within Greater London
- Population: 9,270 (2011 Census. Knightsbridge and Belgravia Ward)
- OS grid reference: TQ275797
- London borough: Westminster; Kensington & Chelsea
- Ceremonial county: Greater London
- Region: London
- Country: England
- Sovereign state: United Kingdom
- Post town: LONDON
- Postcode district: SW1X, SW3, SW7
- Dialling code: 020
- Police: Metropolitan
- Fire: London
- Ambulance: London
- UK Parliament: Cities of London and Westminster; Kensington and Bayswater
- London Assembly: West Central

Knightsbridge is a residential and retail district in central London, south of Hyde Park. It is identified in the London Plan as one of two international retail centres in London, alongside the West End. Knightsbridge is also the name of the roadway which runs near the south side of Hyde Park from Hyde Park Corner.

Knightsbridge is an affluent district in London with a rich history. Its name has Old English origins, meaning "bridge of the young men or retainers." The area was initially divided between local authorities and has been home to several parishes. Knightsbridge is known as the home of exclusive department stores including Harrods and Harvey Nichols, banks and schools catering to a global clientele including Hill House International Junior School, as well as for renowned restaurants and high-end salons. Property prices in the district are among the highest in the world, with the most expensive apartment at One Hyde Park selling for £100 million in 2007.

Knightsbridge is located between Exhibition Road and Sloane Street, with its southern border along Brompton Road, Beauchamp Place, and the western section of Pont Street. The district has been a target for high-profile crimes throughout history, including the Spaghetti House siege, the Walton's Restaurant bombing, and the Knightsbridge Security Deposit robbery. It is served by Knightsbridge station on the Piccadilly line and Sloane Square station on the District and Circle lines.

== Toponymy ==
Knightsbridge is an ancient name, spelt in a variety of ways in Saxon and Old English, such as Cnihtebricge (c. 1050); Knichtebrig (1235); Cnichtebrugge (13th century); and Knyghtesbrugg (1364). The meaning is "bridge of the young men or retainers," from the Old English cniht (genitive case plural –a) and brycg. Cniht, in pre-Norman days, did not have the later meaning of a warrior on horseback, but simply meant a youth. The allusion may be to a place where cnihtas congregated: bridges and wells seem always to have been favourite gathering places of young people, and the original bridge was where one of the old roads to the west crossed the River Westbourne. However, there is possibly a more specific reference to the important cnihtengild ('guild of cnihtas') in 11th-century London and to the limits of its jurisdiction (certainly Knightsbridge was one of the limits of the commercial jurisdiction of the City of London in the 12th century).

== History ==
Map showing two Knightsbridge wards of Westminster Metropolitan Borough (to the west) as they appeared in 1916

Knightsbridge was a hamlet located primarily in the parish of St Margaret (detached) and partly in St Martin in the Fields (the part that later became St George Hanover Square). It also extended into the parishes of Kensington and Chelsea. It was therefore divided between local authorities from a very early time.

In the time of Edward I, the manor of Knightsbridge appertained to the abbey of Westminster. It was named after a crossing of the River Westbourne, which is now an underground river. It is recorded that the citizens of London met Matilda of England at the Knight's Bridge in 1141.

From 1885 to 1887, as a result of the opening of trade between Britain and the Far East, Humphreys' Hall in Knightsbridge hosted an exhibition of Japanese culture in a setting built to resemble a traditional Japanese village. The exhibition was very popular, with over 250,000 visitors during its early months. Japanese artisans illustrated "the manners, customs and art-industries of their country, attired in their national and picturesque costumes. Magnificently decorated and illuminated Buddhist temple. Five o'clock tea in the Japanese tea-house. Japanese Musical and other Entertainments. Every-day Life as in Japan". W. S. Gilbert and his wife attended the exhibition, which is said to have inspired him to write The Mikado. When the Mikado requests of Ko-Ko the address of his son (Nanki-Poo) after Ko-Ko tells the Mikado that Nanki-Poo has "gone abroad", Ko-Ko replies that Nanki-Poo has gone to Knightsbridge.

== Geography ==
Knightsbridge is east of Exhibition Road and west of Sloane Street. Brompton Road, Beauchamp Place and the western section of Pont Street serve roughly as its southern border together with their adjacent gardens and squares such as Ovington Square, Lennox Gardens and Cadogan Square. South of this area, the district fades into Chelsea while Belgravia lies to the east and South Kensington to the west.

== Economy ==
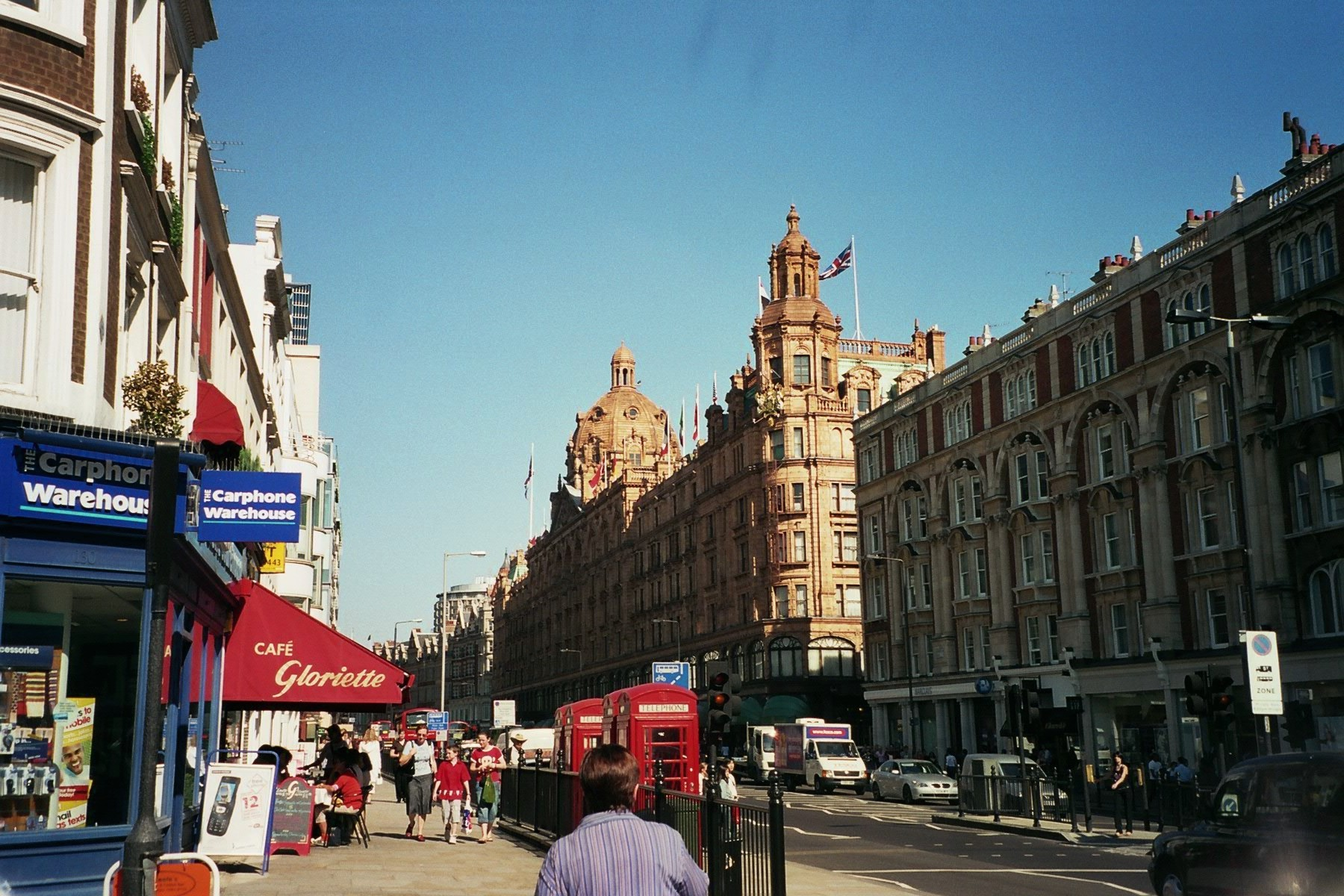
Stores in Knightsbridge

Knightsbridge is home to many expensive shops, including the department stores Harrods and Harvey Nichols, and flagship stores of many British and international fashion houses, including those of London-based shoe designers Jimmy Choo and Manolo Blahnik, and two Prada stores. The district also has banks that cater to wealthy individuals. Some of London's most renowned restaurants are here, as well as many exclusive hair and beauty salons, antiques and antiquities dealers, and chic bars and clubs. One of Bonhams auction houses is located in Knightsbridge.

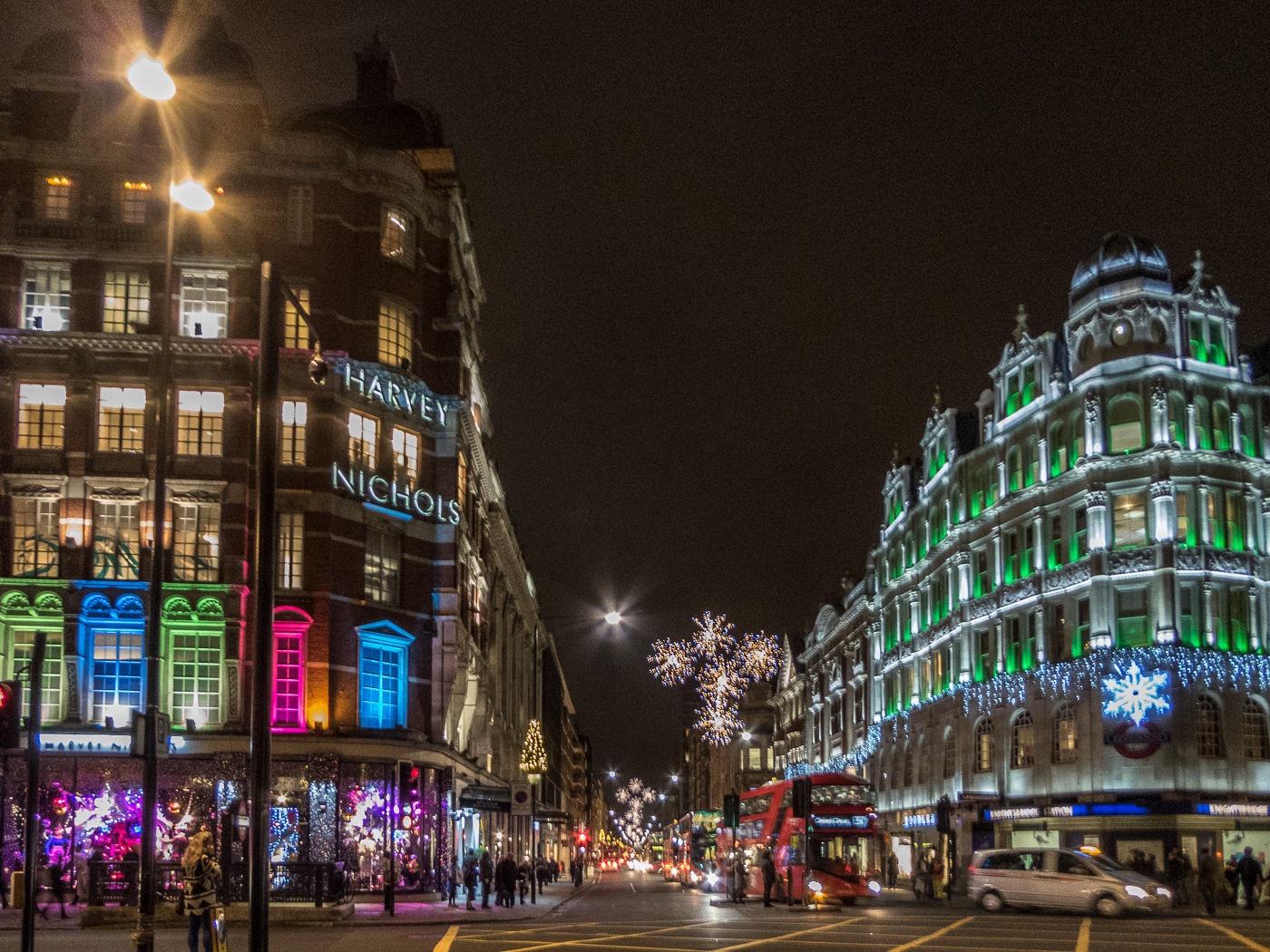
Holiday-decorated store fronts in Knightsbridge at nighttime

=== Property ===
The district and the road itself, which is the only definitive place within it, is small, which assists its cachet: more than half of the zone closest to its tube station (and nearer to no others) is Knightsbridge Underground station. Knightsbridge had in its park side, east and west gold-coloured blocks of exceptional wealth in philanthropist Charles Booth's late Victorian Poverty Map, formerly excluding Brompton Road to the west but extending well into Piccadilly, St James's to the east. Knightsbridge is home to many of the world's richest people and has some of the highest property prices in the world. In 2014 a terrace of 427 m^{2} sold for £15,950,000, a home in Montpelier Square. The average asking price for all the properties in slightly wider SW7 was £4,348,911 (as at Autumn 2014). On-street parking spaces have sold for as much as £300,000 for a 94-year lease. Fourteen of Britain's two hundred most expensive streets are in the neighbourhood, as defined by The Times.

==== One Hyde Park ====
In February 2007, the world's most expensive apartment at One Hyde Park, sold off plan for £100 million, bought by a Qatari prince, and another apartment at the same place in February 2009, at almost the same price, was bought by a Qatari prince. Apartments of this secure, optimum specification, address equate to in excess of £4,000 per square foot (£43,000 per square metre).

In 2014, a 16,000-square-foot (1,500-square-metre) two-storey penthouse in One Hyde Park sold for £140 million.

==== History of property construction ====
Land in Knightsbridge is for the most part identified by City of Westminster (and by the RBKC, where former Brompton parts are included) as strengthened planning law-governed Conservation Areas: 'Albert Gate', 'Belgravia', 'Knightsbridge' and 'Knightsbridge Green'. Properties must be offered here by developers as refurbished flats or houses meeting the enhanced architectural demands in the local Conservation Areas policy of the Local Plan. Within each many buildings are covered by the similar but separate requirements of being listed. Growing demand has since 2000 persuaded the authority to revise its planning policies to permit roof terraces and basement extensions, for residential facilities from leisure suites to private nightclubs, a degree of economic liberalisation documented by a non-tabloid paper in 2008.

The underlying landowners of the few streets making up, without any dispute, Knightsbridge are the Duke of Westminster, Lord Cadogan and the Wellcome Trust with a minority of the freeholds to houses in each street sold to others. Red-brick Queen Anne revival buildings form most of the Cadogan Estates, whereas white stucco-fronted houses are mostly found on the Grosvenor Estate, designed by architect Thomas Cubitt.

The Brompton Oratory, a place of Catholic worship, marks one of the transitions into Kensington, but Belgravia and Brompton have competing mapped neighbourhood status in the east and south of the neighbourhood, and as they have no eponymously named tube stations or historic parish boundaries, their limits are arbitrary and the triangular salient of Brompton, administratively in Kensington, as part of South Kensington, once coloured mid-wealth by Charles Booth, is now blurred with 'Knightsbridge', into which it long projected.

Brompton is only used when the postcode and/or Royal Borough of Kensington and Chelsea is being emphasised, rather than the modern Central London 'district' definitions, which suggest Knightsbridge or South Kensington, either tube station, being at most 350 m away and thus can be easily found on all maps.

== Crime ==
For centuries, the area was renowned as the haunt of highwaymen, robbers and cutthroats targeting travellers on the western route out of London, but its fortunes were transformed in the 19th century. However, the area has been a target of several high-profile crimes.

In September and October 1975, the Spaghetti House siege happened.

In November 1975, two civilians were killed by the Provisional Irish Republican Army (IRA) in the Walton's Restaurant bombing.

In 1980, the Iranian Embassy siege took place, lasting several days. It ended when the Special Air Service stormed the building, which was on live television.

In 1983, three Christmas shoppers and three Metropolitan Police officers were killed by an IRA car bomb outside Harrods.

In 1987, the Knightsbridge Security Deposit centre was the target of a robbery worth £60 million.

In 2005, 22-year-old beautician Clare Bernal was gunned down by her Slovak ex-boyfriend Michal Pech on the shopfloor of Harvey Nichols where she was finishing her shift in front of colleagues and shoppers before Pech fatally turned the gun on himself. The case attracted extensive coverage in the media, and Clare's mother Patricia has since led a campaign to address flaws in the system, which allowed her daughter's murder to happen.

Many residential buildings are heavily covered by CCTV and are staffed by security guards, and railings or bars on lower floor windows are commonplace.

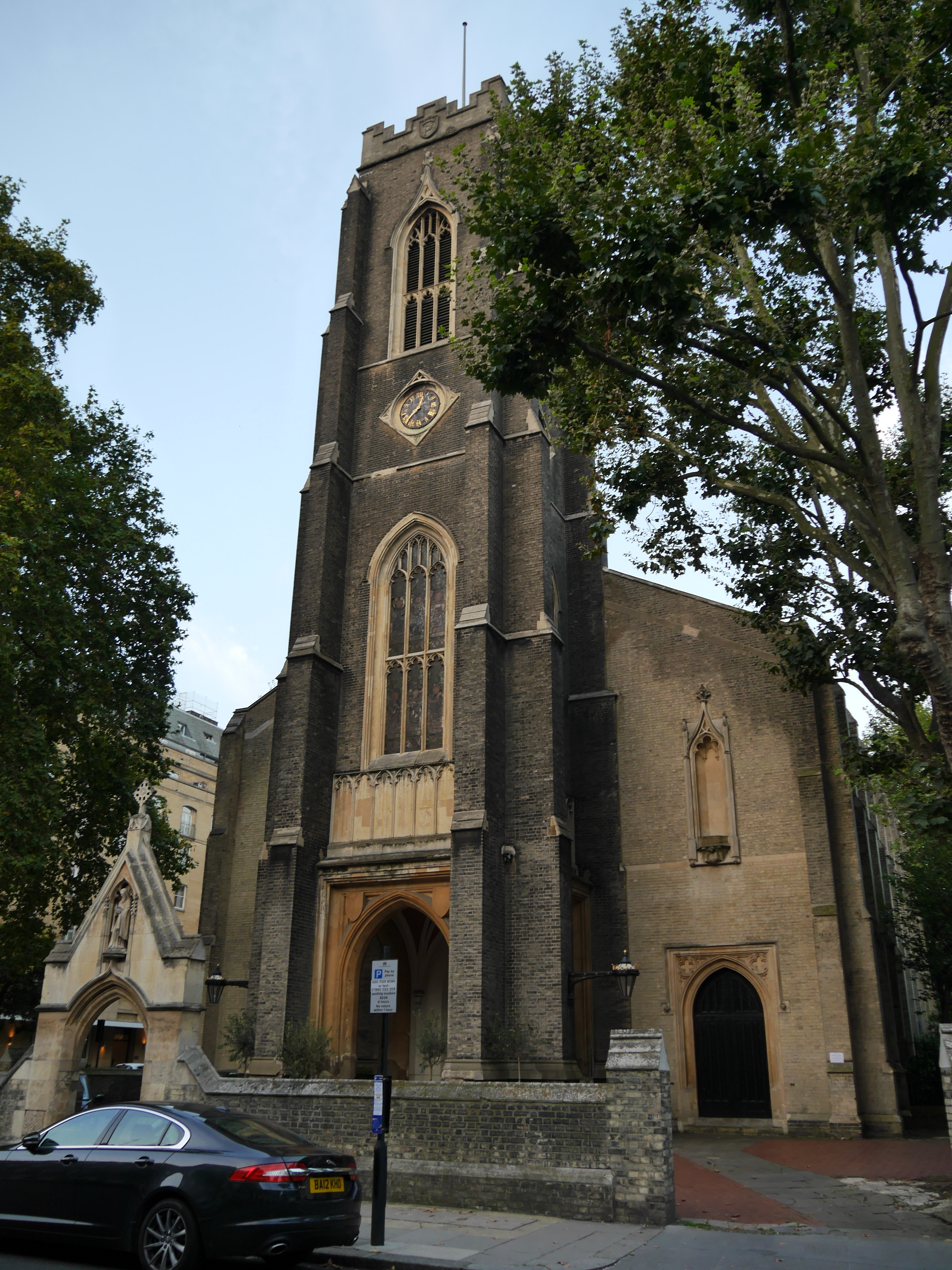
St Paul's, Knightsbridge

== Buildings ==
To the north of the area, is the Hyde Park Barracks of the Household Cavalry, with a distinctive 33-storey tower by Sir Basil Spence. The Royalty and Diplomatic Protection Department is based in Walton Street. The Embassy of Libya is located at 15 Knightsbridge, the Embassy of France at no 58 and the Embassy of Kuwait at 2 Albert Gate, just off Knightsbridge.

On the religious side, it contains the impressive Brompton Oratory (Catholic church, Brompton Road) and the CoE Holy Trinity Church behind it, a Church of Jesus Christ of Latter Day Saints in Exhibition Road, the Russian Orthodox Church in Ennismore Gardens, St Columba's Church of Scotland, Pont Street, and Deutsche Evangelische Christuskirche. The former St Saviour's church, designed by George Basevi, is now a private home.

Notably, two of the four London buildings of Hill House School are located here at Cadogan Gardens and Hans Place.

== Transport ==
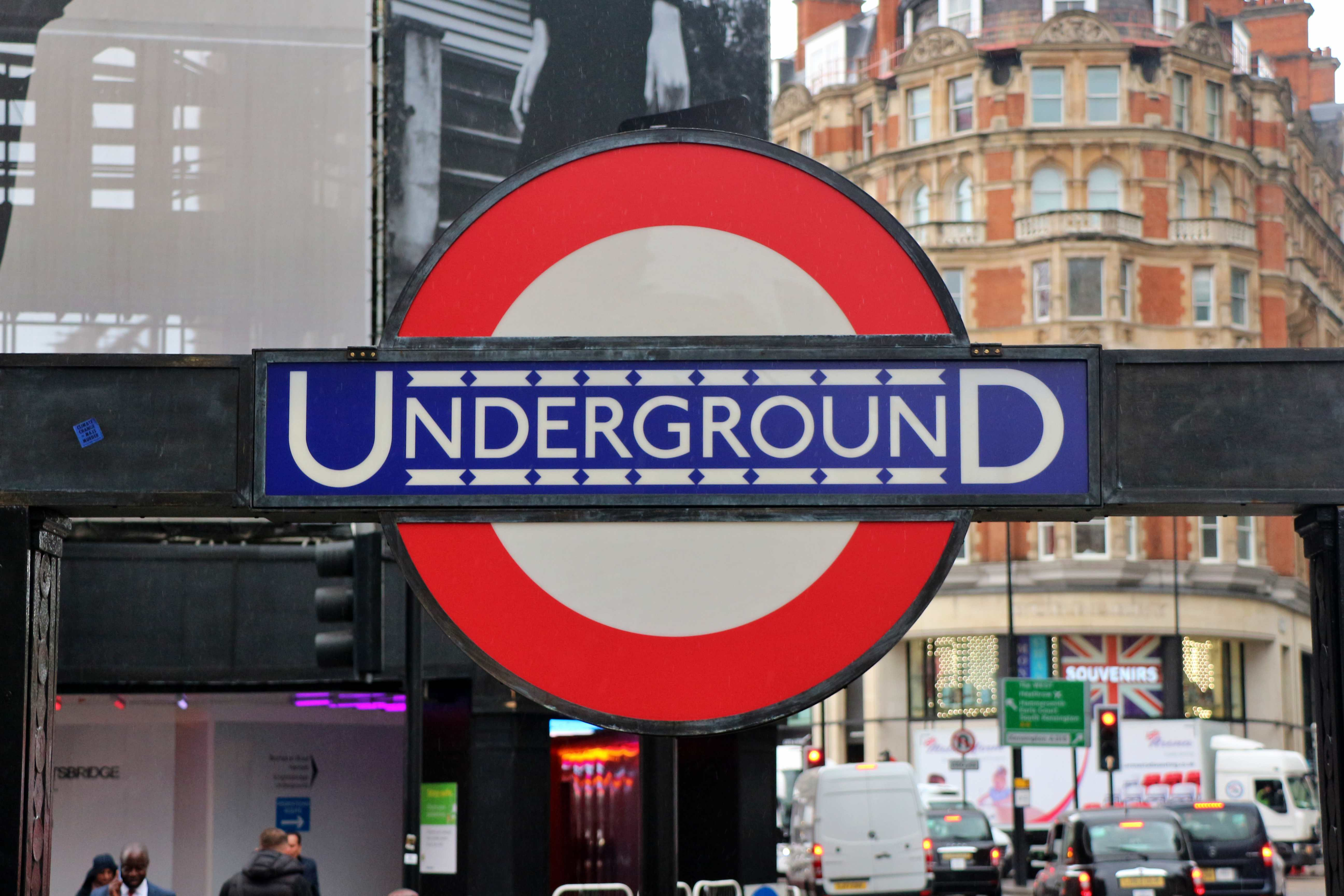
Underground sign for Knightsbridge station

Knightsbridge takes its name from the road that runs along the south side of Hyde Park, west from Hyde Park Corner, spanning the City of Westminster and the Royal Borough of Kensington and Chelsea. Up to Brompton Road, it is a part of the A4 arterial road, while the remainder is part of the A315 road. West of Rutland Gardens, the road becomes Kensington Road.

It is served by Knightsbridge station on the Piccadilly line, and Sloane Square station on the District and Circle lines. Brompton Road station closed in 1934.

== Cultural references ==
Eric Coates uses Knightsbridge as the setting of a march for the 3rd movement of his London Suite (1933). It gained popularity through the radio show In Town Tonight (1933–1960).

Knightsbridge is referenced in the Rolling Stones song "Play with Fire", released in 1965. Knightsbridge is used as an indicator of a character's affluence, as opposed to the more working class Stepney.

According to season 3 episode 'Happy New Year,' Knightsbridge is the setting of the television series "Absolutely Fabulous". St. Columba's Church in Knightsbridge is the setting of a wedding in the 1996 episode 'The Last Shout.'

Knightsbridge is referenced in the story book Neverwhere by Neil Gaiman as a place the protagonists need to cross to go to the next floating market. "The Knightsbridge" is used as metaphor for the night and its dangers they need to pass through.

In the 2017 film The Foreigner, Knightsbridge is the location of a detonated bomb that sets the plot in motion.

On his 2017 mixtape Working on Dying Swedish rapper Bladee references Knightsbridge in the title and lyrics of a song.

Bars, clubs and restaurants of Knightsbridge frequently feature in the Channel4's reality television show Made in Chelsea.

== See also ==
- Royal Thames Yacht Club, 60 Knightsbridge
- St Columba's Church of Scotland, Pont Street
- Caledonian Club

== Bibliography ==
- Cellier, François; Cunningham Bridgeman (1914). Gilbert, Sullivan, and D'Oyly Carte. London: Sir Isaac Pitman & Sons.
