= Brompton Road =

Street in Knightsbridge district in West London

Coordinates: 51.4989°N 0.1650°W

- Interactive map of Brompton Road
- From: Knightsbridge Underground station
- To: Egerton Gardens

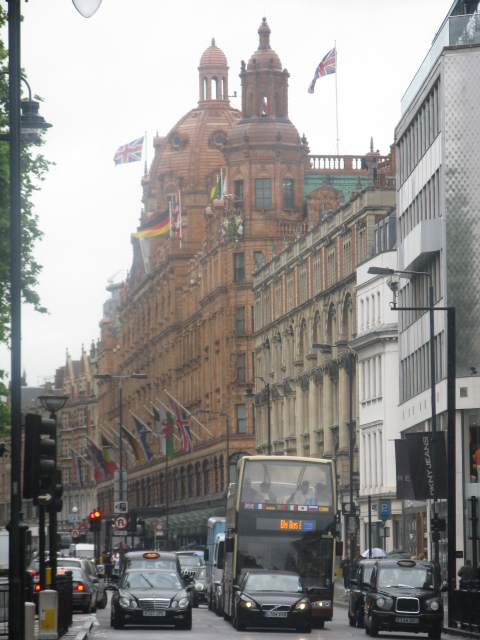
Brompton Road in the district of Knightsbridge

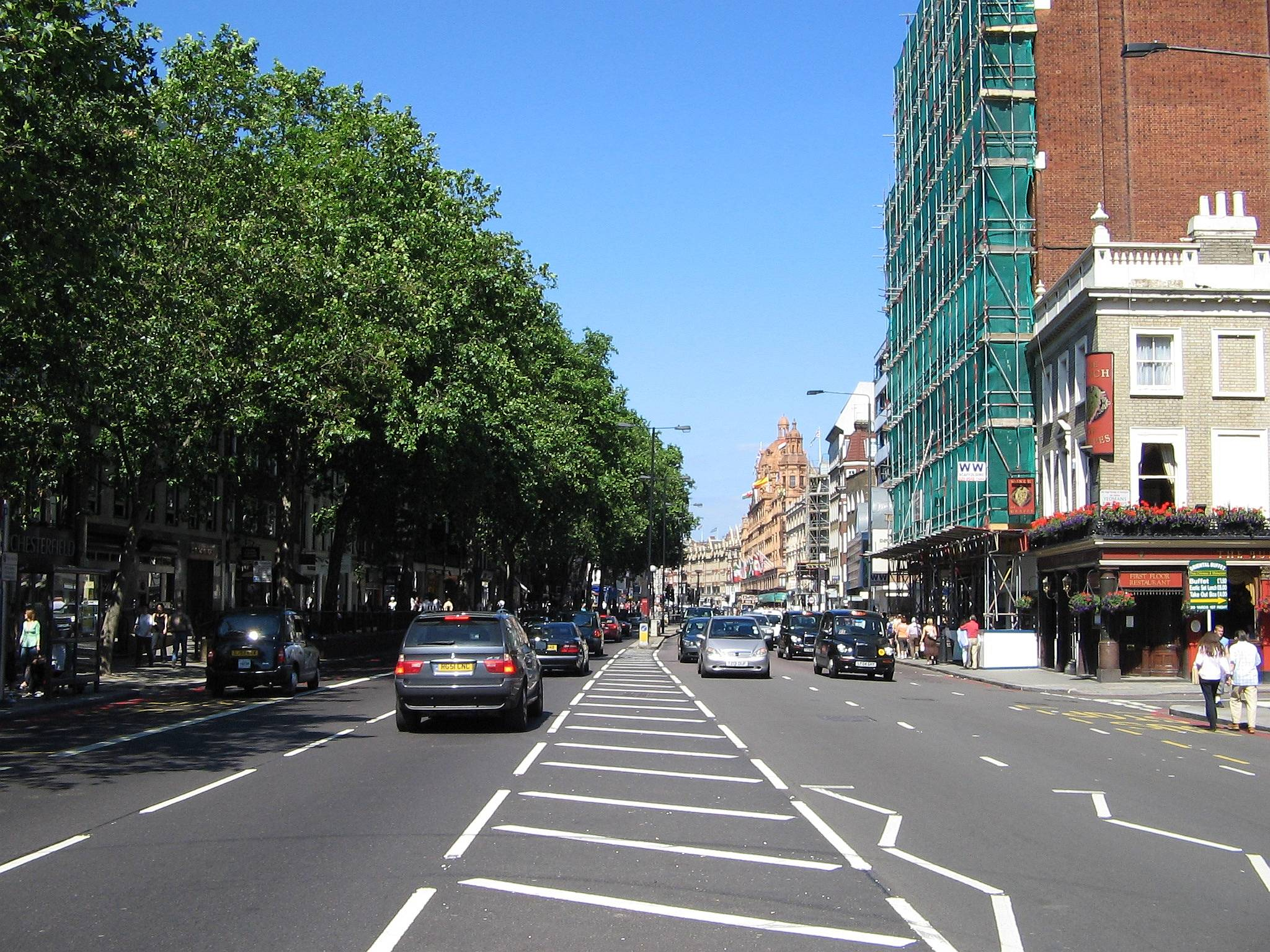
Brompton Road, eastward aspect

Brompton Road is a street located in the southern part from Knightsbridge and in the eastern part from Brompton in the Royal Borough of Kensington and Chelsea and partly the City of Westminster in London.

It starts from Knightsbridge Underground station and runs south-west through an extremely wealthy residential area until it reaches Egerton Gardens and the area to the east of South Kensington Underground station. It ends at what is popularly known as Brompton Cross, becoming Fulham Road, home of Chelsea Football Club.

There are 5-star hotels and many top restaurants and shops along the road. One of the most famous department stores in the world, Harrods, is located near the eastern end. Another major landmark along the road is the Church of the Immaculate Heart of Mary, commonly known as the Brompton Oratory. The Embassy of Uruguay is located at no. 150.

Brompton Road Underground station was halfway between Knightsbridge and South Kensington stations on the Piccadilly line, just east of the Brompton Oratory. It closed on 30 July 1934 due to a lack of traffic and following the opening of new entrances at Knightsbridge station.

Brompton Road is sometimes confused with Old Brompton Road which lies further to the west in South Kensington.

In the 1980s, a bomb unexpectedly went off just outside of Harrod's. A police man and some shoppers were killed. The IRA claimed responsibility, and that the bombing was unintended.

== See also ==
- Brompton, London
