= Hyde Park Corner tube station =

London Underground station

Hyde Park Corner
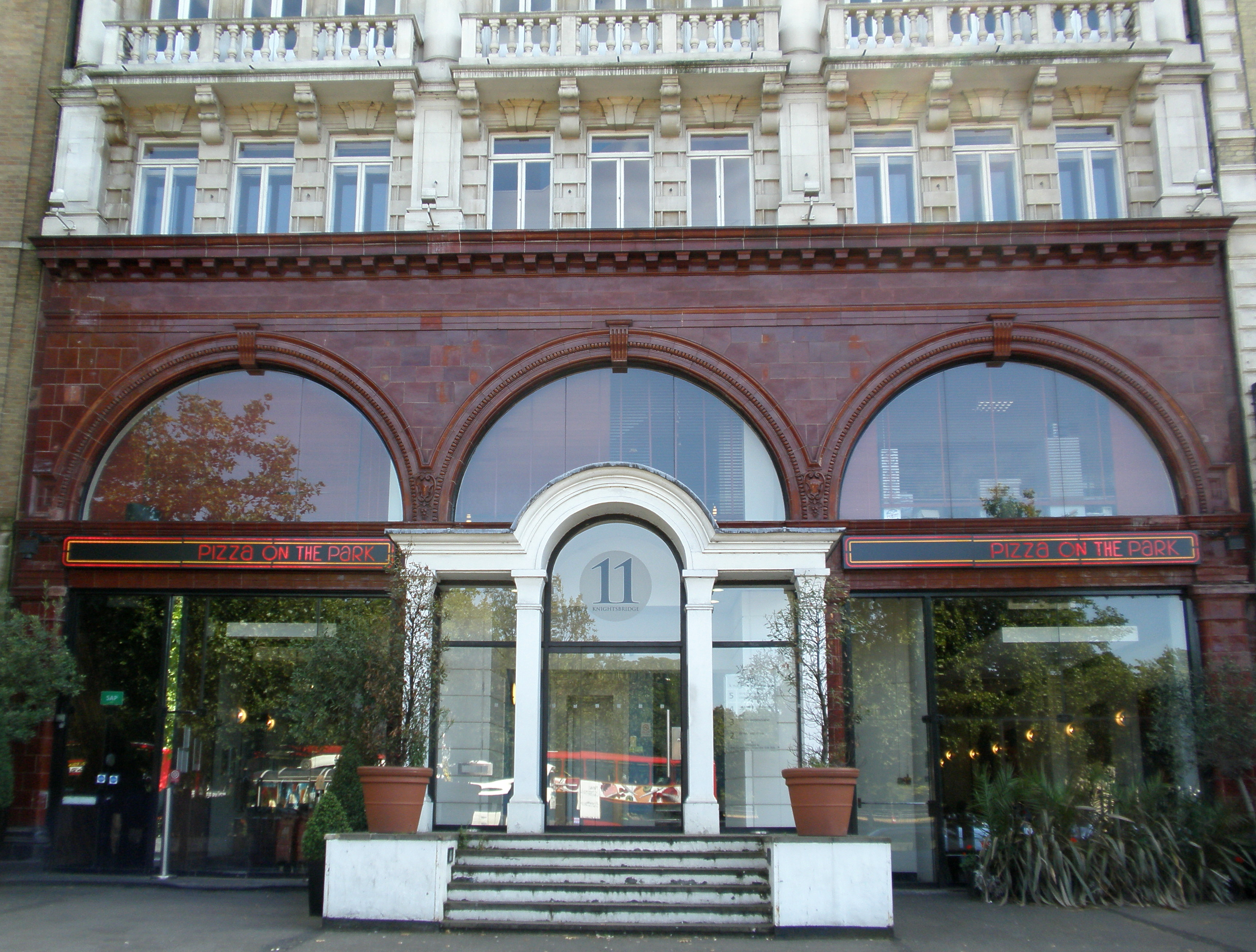
- Former Hyde Park Corner station building
- Interactive map of Hyde Park Corner

General information
- Location: Hyde Park Corner
- Local authority: Westminster
- Managed by: London Underground
- Number of platforms: 2
- Fare zone: 1

London Underground annual entry and exit
- 2020: ▼1.69 million
- 2021: ▲1.88 million
- 2022: ▲4.74 million
- 2023: ▼4.16 million
- 2024: ▼3.61 million

Railway companies
- Original company: Great Northern, Piccadilly and Brompton Railway

Key dates
- 15 December 1906: Station opened

Other information
- External links: TfL station info page
- Coordinates: 51.50278°N 0.15278°W

Hyde Park Corner is a London Underground station. It is located near Hyde Park Corner in Hyde Park, London. The station is on the Piccadilly line, between Knightsbridge and Green Park stations. It is in London fare zone 1.

== History ==
The station was opened by the Great Northern, Piccadilly and Brompton Railway on 15 December 1906. It was the connecting station between the two original companies, the London United Railway and the Piccadilly and City Railway, who amalgamated after Parliament demanded the entire line from Hammersmith to Finsbury Park should be built as one scheme. When the station was rebuilt with escalators the adjacent little-used station at Down Street to the east (towards Green Park) was taken out of use.

== Design ==
The original, Leslie Green-designed station building still remains to the south of the road junction, notable by its ox-blood coloured tiles; it was until June 2010 used as a pizza restaurant, and since 14 December 2012 it has been the Wellesley Hotel. The building was taken out of use when the station was provided with escalators in place of lifts and a new sub-surface ticket hall that came into use on 23 May 1932 although an emergency stairway provides a connection to the platforms. The lift shafts are now used to provide ventilation. The 1932 station had showcases inset to the walls that showed a series of dioramas depicting the development of the London bus – long gone, some of the scale models survive in the London Transport Museum collections.

It is one of the few stations on the network which have no associated buildings above ground, the station being fully underground. The current entrance to the station is accessed from within the pedestrian underpass system around the Hyde Park Corner junction.

When the central section of the Piccadilly line is closed, the station becomes the terminus of the western part due to the crossover tunnel to the east of the station.

== Location ==
Various day and nighttime London Buses routes serve the station.

== Bibliography ==
- Horne, Mike (2007). The Piccadilly Line. Capital Transport. ISBN 978-1-85414-305-1.

Preceding station	London Underground	Following station
Knightsbridge towards Uxbridge, Rayners Lane or Heathrow Airport (Terminal 4 or Terminal 5)	Piccadilly line	Green Park towards Cockfosters or Arnos Grove
Former Route
Preceding station	London Underground	Following station
Knightsbridge towards Hammersmith	Piccadilly line	Down Street towards Finsbury Park
