= Down Street tube station =

Closed London Underground station

Down Street
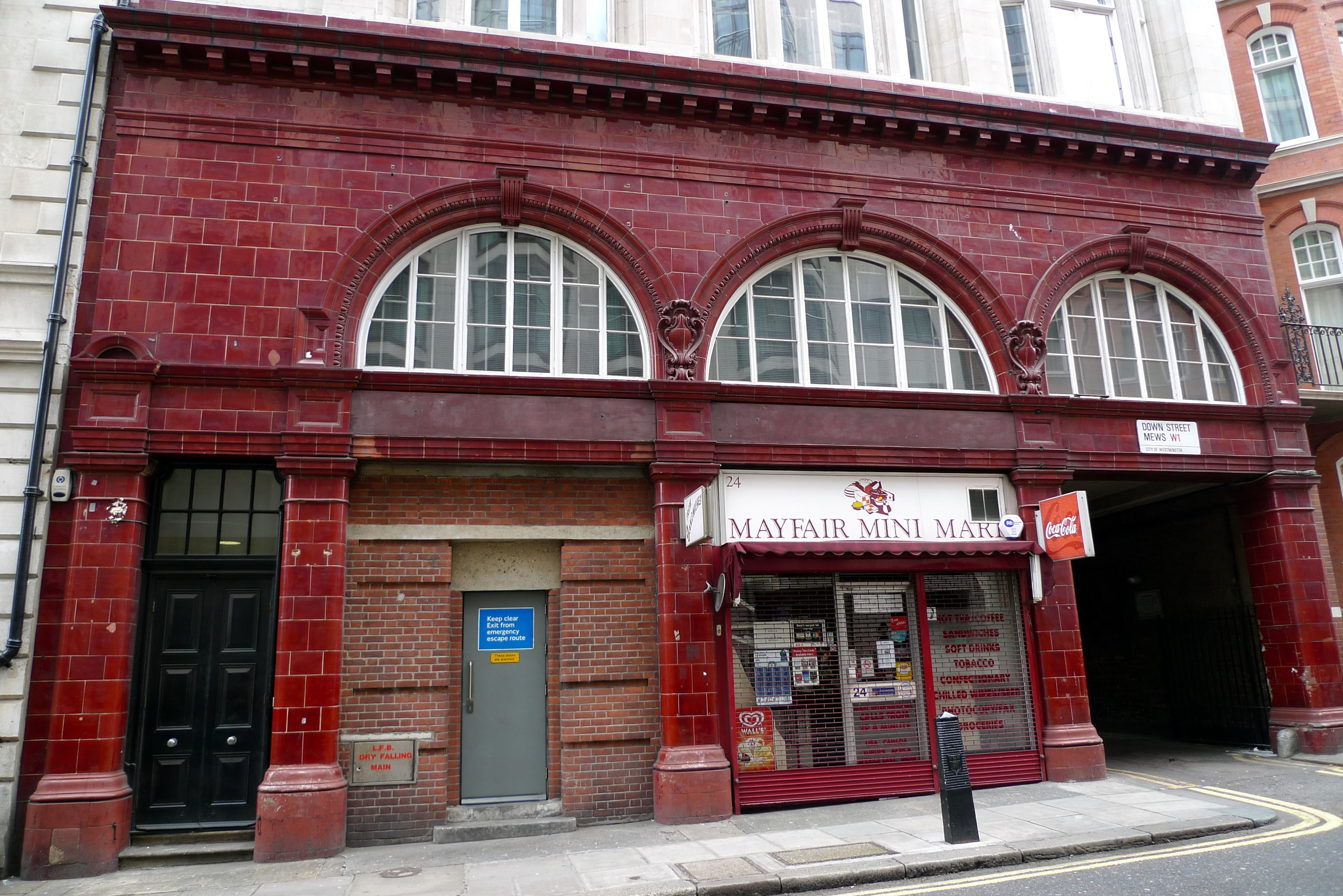
- The station features a red glazed terracotta façade common to most built by the UERL
- Interactive map of Down Street

General information
- Location: Mayfair
- Local authority: City of Westminster
- Owner: Great Northern, Piccadilly and Brompton Railway
- Number of platforms: 2

Key dates
- 1907: Opened
- 1932: Closed
- Replaced by: None

Other information
- Coordinates: 51.50465°N 0.14791°W

Down Street, also known as Down Street (Mayfair), is a disused station on the London Underground, located in Mayfair, west London. The Great Northern, Piccadilly and Brompton Railway opened it in 1907. It was latterly served by the Piccadilly line and was situated between Dover Street (now named Green Park) and Hyde Park Corner stations.

The station was little used; many trains passed through without stopping. Lack of patronage and proximity to other stations led to its closure in 1932. During the Second World War it was used as a bunker by the Prime Minister, Winston Churchill, and the war cabinet. The station building survives and is close to Down Street's junction with Piccadilly. Part of it is now converted to a retail outlet.

London Transport Museum has been running guided tours of the station through its "Hidden London" programme since 2016. The tour covers the history of the site using archives from the museum's collection, with a focus on its Second World War connection.

== History ==
Plan of station at the lower level as originally built

=== Operation ===
The station is in Down Street in Mayfair, just off Piccadilly and a short distance from Park Lane. It lies between Green Park (originally named Dover Street) and Hyde Park Corner on the Piccadilly line. It was opened by the Great Northern, Piccadilly and Brompton Railway (GNP&BR; the precursor to the Piccadilly line) on 15 March 1907, a few months after the rest of the line opened. (Note: The rest of the GNP&BR opened on 15 December 1906.) The delay was due to difficulties in purchasing the site for the station building and agreeing a safe layout of the passages below ground with the Board of Trade. (Note: Prior to opening, the intention to name the station "Mayfair" was reported in the Railway Gazette (February 1907), but the station opened with the original planned name. Later, roundel signage fixed to platform walls included "(Mayfair)" as a suffix.) The surface building was designed by the Underground Electric Railways Company of London's (UERL's) architect Leslie Green in the UERL house style of a two-storey steel-framed building faced with red glazed terracotta blocks, with wide semi-circular windows on the upper floor. The station had a pair of Otis lifts, with the platforms located 22.2 metres (73 ft) below the street level of Piccadilly.

Down Street was never a busy station, as the surrounding area was largely residential and its residents mostly wealthy enough to travel by other means. The neighbouring stations were also close by, with Dover Street station about 550 metres (600 yd) to the east and Hyde Park Corner 500 metres (550 yd) to the west. From 1909, like Brompton Road, Down Street was often skipped by trains. From 1918 it was closed on Sundays.

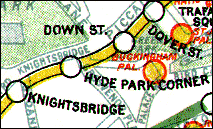
Down Street station on a 1912 Tube map

In 1929, Down Street was one of the stations suggested for closure in connection with the extension of the Piccadilly line: the elimination of less-busy stations in the central area would improve both reliability and journey times for long-distance commuters. (Note: The report recommending closure recorded that the station had an annual usage of 1,236,250 passengers and takings of £5,005. The other stations considered for closure were York Road (closed 1932), Brompton Road (closed 1934), Regent's Park, Mornington Crescent, Hyde Park Corner, Gillespie Road (now Arsenal), Gloucester Road and Covent Garden.) Additionally, the neighbouring stations were being rebuilt with escalators in place of lifts and their new entrances were even nearer to Down Street, further squeezing its catchment area. The station was permanently closed on 21 May 1932.

After the station was closed it was almost immediately modified. The western headwalls of both platform tunnels were rebuilt to allow a step plate junction to be installed, (Note: A step plate junction is constructed where tunnels of differing diameters join. The step is the vertical wall filling the gap between them.) providing access from the eastbound and westbound tunnels to a new siding located between Down Street and Hyde Park Corner. The siding is mainly used to reverse westbound trains, but could also be used for servicing trains. The siding tunnel is accessible at its western end through a small foot tunnel constructed from Hyde Park Corner station. The lifts were removed and the shafts adapted to provide additional tunnel ventilation.

=== Wartime use and after ===
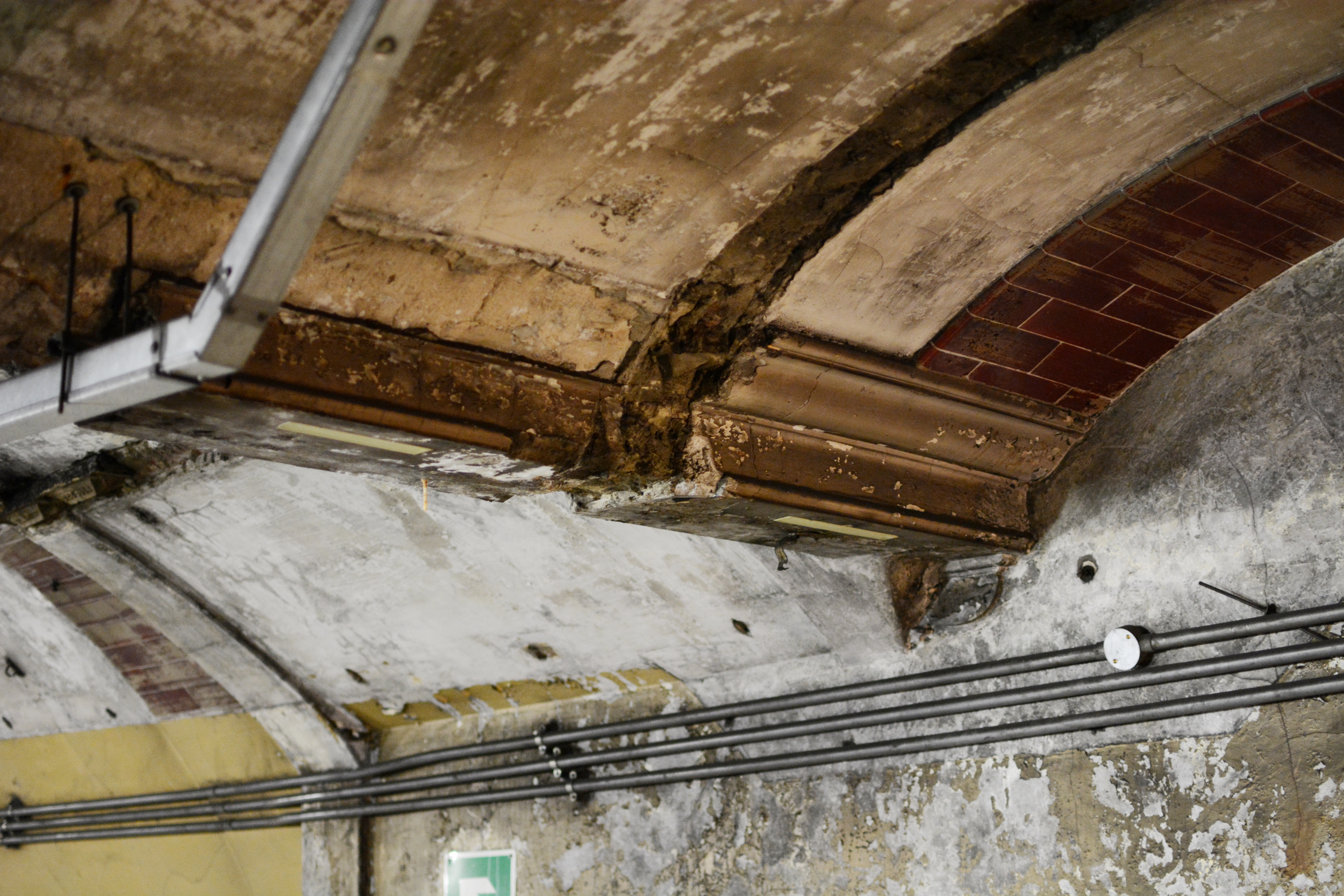
Scar where wartime partition has been removed

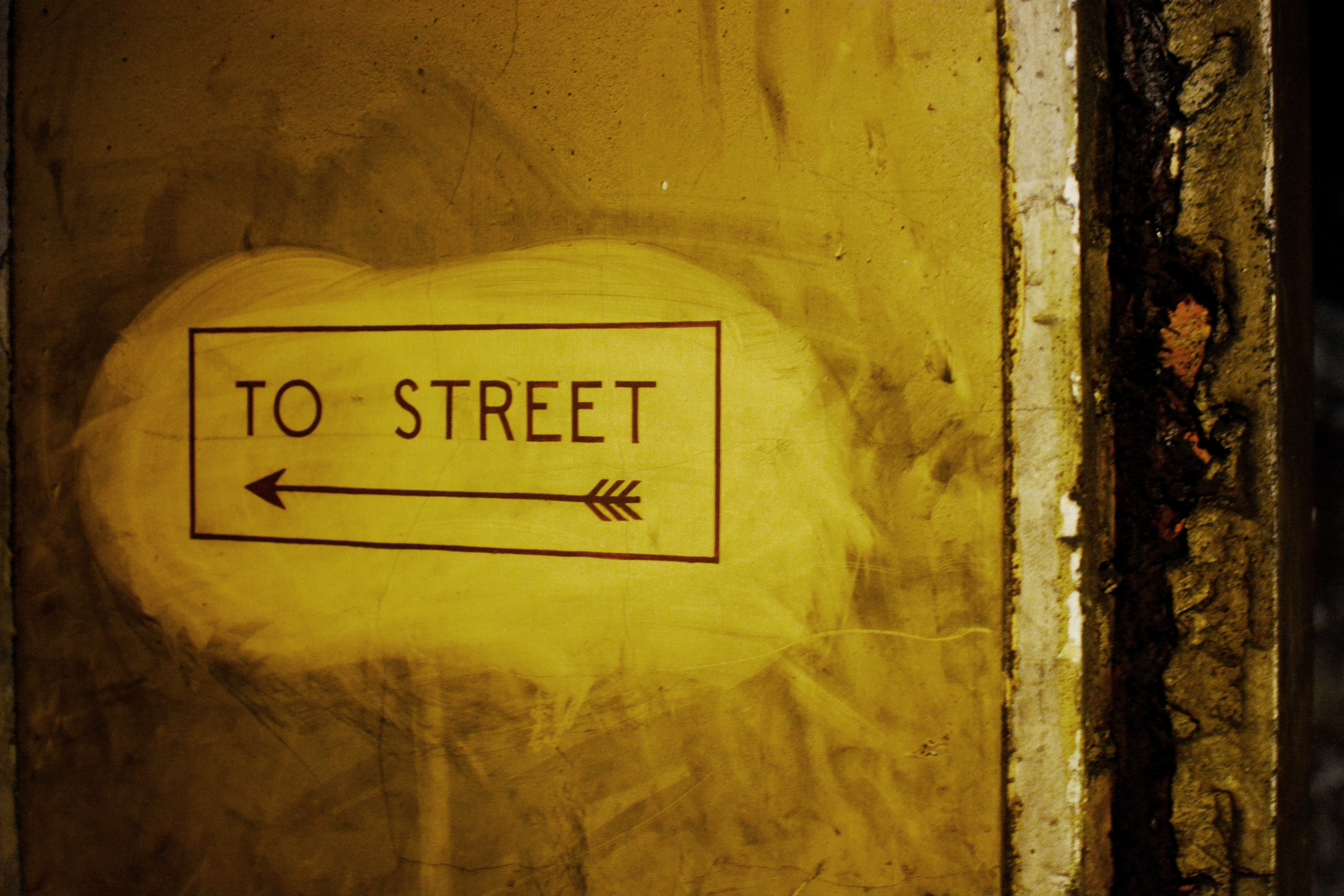
Direction signage

The station was selected for use as an underground bunker in early 1939 as part of a programme of developing deep shelters to protect government operations from bombing in the event of war. The platform faces were bricked up and the enclosed platform areas and space in the circulation passages were divided up into offices, meeting rooms and dormitories. The engineering and structural work was carried out by the London Passenger Transport Board and the fitting-out of the rooms and installation of the power and communications equipment was done by the London, Midland and Scottish Railway. A two-person lift was installed in the original emergency stairwell and a telephone exchange, toilets and bathrooms were added. The main occupant of the shelter was the Railway Executive Committee, (Note: The role of the Railway Executive Committee was to coordinate the operations of the various railway companies including routing trains to maintain services after bomb damage to railway infrastructure. It was staffed by employees of the Southern, London, Midland & Scottish, London & North Eastern and Great Western railways, as well as from London Transport.) but it was also used as a shelter by the Prime Minister, Winston Churchill, and the war cabinet until the Cabinet War Rooms were ready; Churchill called it "The Barn".

Since the end of the war, the station has been used only for engineering access and as an emergency exit point from the Underground.

In April 2015, Transport for London announced that it was seeking proposals for the commercial use of parts of the surface building, disused lift shaft and underground passages. Suggested possible uses included a restaurant, a bar, a theatre, a gallery or retail space. Tours by the London Transport Museum through its "Hidden London" programme began in 2016.

== Use in media ==
Down Street is the inspiration for a location in the television series and novel Neverwhere, where it provides an entrance to an underground labyrinth. A much modified and expanded version of the station appears as a part of a level in the video game Shadow Man, which was used as Jack the Ripper's hideout.

Part of the 2004 British horror film Creep was set in Down Street station, although the scenes were actually shot at the disused Aldwych station and on studio sets. The British band Hefner released a song titled "Down Street" on their 2006 album Catfight; according to its sleeve notes, it is set in the early 1930s and tells the story of two lovers who meet at the station. Steve Hackett also recorded a song titled "Down Street" on his 2006 album Wild Orchids, about the station.

The station features in Billy Connolly's World Tour of England, Ireland and Wales, Dan Cruickshank's National Geographic Channel series Great Railway Adventures and the 2012 TV series The Tube.

== Notes and references ==
Notes

Bibliography

- Connor, J. E. (2006) [1999]. London's Disused Underground Stations (2nd (revised) ed.). Capital Transport. ISBN 1-85414-250-X.
- Emmerson, Andrew; Beard, Tony (2004). London's Secret Tubes. Capital Transport. ISBN 1-85414-283-6.
- Rose, Douglas (1999) [1980]. The London Underground, A Diagrammatic History (7th ed.). Douglas Rose/Capital Transport. ISBN 1-85414-219-4.
- Wolmar, Christian (2005) [2004]. The Subterranean Railway: How the London Underground Was Built and How It Changed the City Forever. Atlantic Books. ISBN 1-84354-023-1.

Former Route
Preceding station	London Underground	Following station
Hyde Park Corner towards Hammersmith	Piccadilly line	Dover Street towards Finsbury Park
