= Knightsbridge tube station =

London Underground station

Knightsbridge
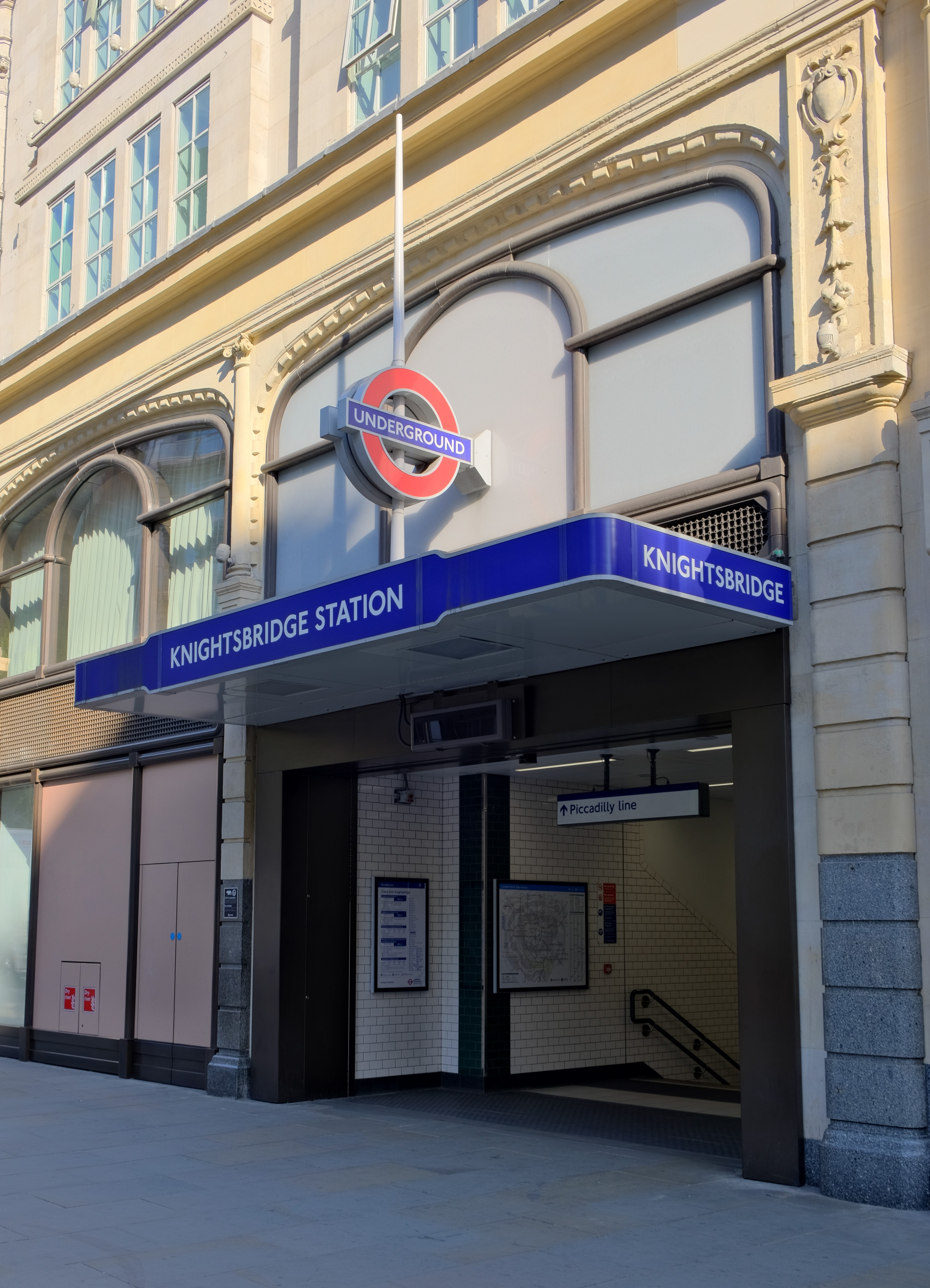
- Brompton Road entrance as seen in April 2025
- Interactive map of Knightsbridge

General information
- Location: Knightsbridge
- Local authority: Kensington & Chelsea
- Managed by: London Underground
- Number of platforms: 2
- Accessible: Yes
- Fare zone: 1

London Underground annual entry and exit
- 2021: ▲7.45 million
- 2022: ▲13.27 million
- 2023: ▲13.57 million
- 2024: ▲13.66 million
- 2025: ▼13.17 million

Railway companies
- Original company: Great Northern, Piccadilly and Brompton Railway

Key dates
- 15 December 1906: Station opened

Other information
- External links: TfL station info page
- Coordinates: 51.50167°N 0.16083°W

Knightsbridge (/ˈnaɪtsbrɪdʒ/) is a London Underground station. It is located in the Royal Borough of Kensington and Chelsea. The station is on the Piccadilly line, between South Kensington and Hyde Park Corner stations. It is in London fare zone 1.

The station is positioned near the junction of Knightsbridge, Brompton Road, and Sloane Street, with multiple entrances providing access to nearby landmarks, including the Harrods and Harvey Nichols department stores.

== History ==
=== Origins ===
The first plans for a tube station at Knightsbridge were published in November 1896, with a notice that a private bill was to be presented to Parliament for the construction of the Brompton and Piccadilly Circus Railway (B&PCR). Various further bills and fundraising attempts followed, and the B&PCR merged with the Great Northern and Strand Railway in 1902, to form the Great Northern, Piccadilly and Brompton Railway (GNP&BR). Construction of this railway finally began in July 1902, and it would go on to form the core of today's Piccadilly Line.

The station was opened on 15 December 1906 along with the rest of the line between Hammersmith and Finsbury Park. When opened, the platforms were accessed in the standard manner by four lifts and an emergency staircase connecting to parallel passageways and bridges to midway along the platforms. The original station building designed by Leslie Green was located on Brompton Road a short distance west of its junction with Knightsbridge and Sloane Street. A rear entrance was located on Basil Street.

The location of the station in a busy and fashionable shopping district meant that patronage at the station was high from the beginning, particularly due to the presence locally of the Harrods and Harvey Nichols emporiums. This contrasted with the next station on the line westward — Brompton Road tube station — where passenger numbers were so low that from soon after its opening many trains were timetabled not to stop there.

=== 1930s reconstruction ===
In the early 1930s, the availability of government grants to stimulate the depressed economy enabled the Underground Group to carry out a major modernisation programme, during which many central London stations were brought up to date with escalators to replace the original lifts. Knightsbridge was one of the Piccadilly line stations to benefit from the installation of escalators. The reconstruction project was announced in 1931 with an estimated cost of £200,000, equivalent to £15,000,000 in 2024.

To enable the escalators to reach the existing platforms without excessive below ground reconstruction or interference with station operations, a new ticket hall was constructed under the Brompton Road/Knightsbridge/Sloane Street junction and new circulation passages were constructed at the lower level. A new station entrance was inserted into the existing building on the corner of Brompton Road and Sloane Street. Subway entrances on the other corners of the junction enabled pedestrians to avoid the traffic on the busy junction. The original entrances in Brompton Road and Basil Street were closed. The Brompton Road building was subsequently demolished, but the rear entrance at the corner of Basil Street and Hoopers Court remained, although converted for use as offices.

To ease congestion, it was also decided to provide an additional entrance to the western end of the platforms closer to Harrods. The additional exit would further diminish the passenger numbers at Brompton Road so this station was scheduled to close. A separate ticket hall was provided for the western escalators which is accessed by a long subway from the surface entrance at the corner of Hans Crescent. This narrow subway was to be a regular problem, often becoming congested with groups of passengers trying to pass each other in the confined space.

=== Early 21st-century station upgrades ===
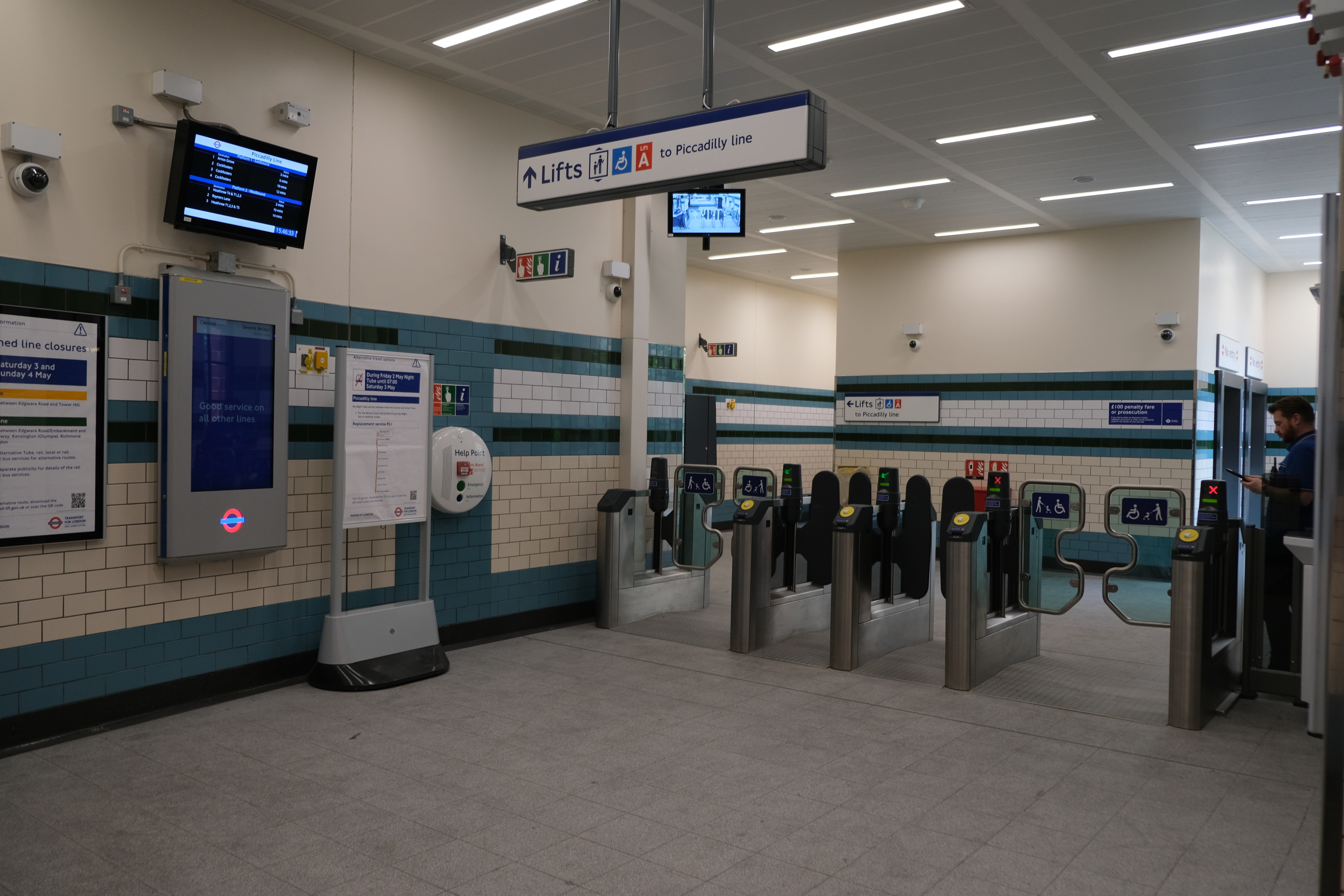
The Hooper's Court entrance and gate line, on the day of opening in April 2025

Since the 2000s, Knightsbridge station has undergone a series of incremental upgrades. In 2004, congestion in the narrow subway leading to the Harrods entrance was alleviated by expanding the exit into a large circular concourse beneath the road toward Harrods. A new stairway exit was constructed in the centre of Hans Crescent, which was pedestrianised to accommodate the changes.

In 2005, the station platforms were refurbished, with the original 1930s cream-coloured tiles concealed behind contemporary metal cladding. In December 2010, a new entrance was opened on the north side of Knightsbridge. This was built as part of the One Hyde Park residential development, and also provided access to the Mandarin Oriental hotel and, via the new Serpentine Walk, to the south side of Hyde Park itself.

In 2017, a major upgrade to the station was announced, with the construction of two new entrances: a stepped entrance on Brompton Road to replace the entrance on the corner of Sloane Street, which had become unsafe due to overcrowding and a narrow pavement, as well as a new step-free entrance from Hoopers Court. Most of the upgrade costs were paid for by Knightsbridge Estate and developers Chelsfield, who own the property above the station and were responsible for the redevelopment. The project cost £33.5 million, of which TfL contributed £12 million, enabling step-free access to be extended to platform level.

The Brompton Road entrance was initially planned to open in 2019 and the Hoopers Court entrance in 2020, but both were delayed. The Brompton Road entrance eventually opened in October 2022. In April 2025, the station became step-free with the opening of the Hoopers Court entrance, making it the 93rd accessible station on the Underground. Two lifts allow for step-free access to the deep-level corridors, whilst a third lift links these to the platforms. This entrance re-uses some areas of the station that had been closed since the early 1930s when escalators were installed.

== Connections ==
A large number of London Buses serve the station day and night.

Preceding station	London Underground	Following station
South Kensington towards Uxbridge, Rayners Lane or Heathrow Airport (Terminal 4 or Terminal 5)	Piccadilly line	Hyde Park Corner towards Cockfosters or Arnos Grove
Former Route
Preceding station	London Underground	Following station
Brompton Road towards Hounslow West or Uxbridge	Piccadilly line 1906–34	Hyde Park Corner towards Cockfosters or Arnos Grove
