= Brompton Road tube station =

Closed London Underground station

Brompton Road
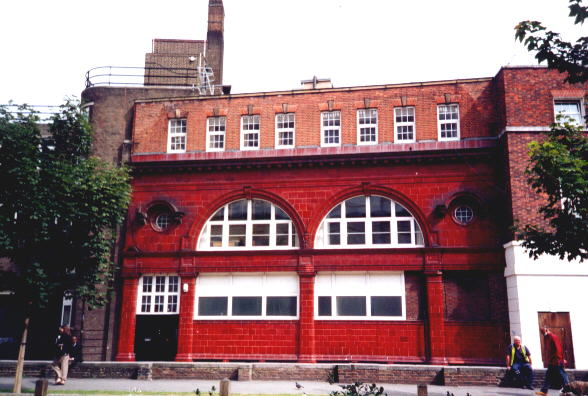
- Brompton Road tube station side entrance on Cottage Place
- Interactive map of Brompton Road

General information
- Location: Brompton
- Local authority: Kensington and Chelsea
- Grid reference: TQ272791
- Number of platforms: 2

Railway companies
- Original company: Great Northern, Piccadilly and Brompton Railway

Key dates
- 15 December 1906: Station opened
- 30 July 1934: Station closed
- Replaced by: None

Other information
- Coordinates: 51.497111°N 0.16889°W

Brompton Road is a disused station on the Piccadilly line of the London Underground, located between Knightsbridge and South Kensington stations.

It was closed in 1934, nearly 28 years after being opened by the Great Northern, Piccadilly and Brompton Railway company. During the Second World War it was used as the command centre of the 26th (London) Anti-Aircraft Brigade. In 2014, the owner of the site, the Ministry of Defence, sold it to a Ukrainian businessman, Dmytro Firtash, who claimed an intention to convert it to residential use.

London Transport Museum runs regular Zoom-hosted virtual tours of the station via its "Hidden London" programme; which explore its time as a Second World War bunker and reveal what it looks like today.

== History ==
Brompton Road was opened on 15 December 1906 by the Great Northern, Piccadilly and Brompton Railway (GNP&BR). The station was located at the junction of Brompton Road and Cottage Place. Although it was conveniently situated for both the Brompton Oratory and the Victoria and Albert Museum, it saw little passenger usage and by October 1909 some services passed through without stopping.

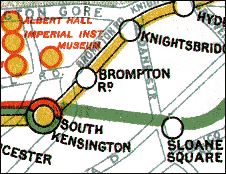
Brompton Road station on a 1912 Tube map

The station closed on 4 May 1926 due to the general strike and did not reopen until 4 October of that year with services initially only calling there on weekdays. Sunday services were restored on 2 January 1927. As before, Brompton Road was little used, to the extent that two of its lifts were removed and relocated elsewhere and the ticket office was closed.

When the adjacent Knightsbridge station was modernised with escalators replacing lifts, it was provided with a new southern entrance that was built closer to Brompton Road station, reducing its catchment area. When the new entrance for Knightsbridge opened on 30 July 1934, Brompton Road closed.

Just prior to the outbreak of the Second World War, the street-level building together with the lift shafts and lower western passages were sold to the War Office for a sum of £22,000 (equivalent to £1.2 million in 2025) for use by the 26th (London) Anti-Aircraft Brigade of the 1st Anti-Aircraft Division. During the War, it was the Royal Artillery's anti-aircraft operations room for central London. This use was discontinued in the 1950s. It was subsequently used as the town headquarters (THQ) of the University of London Air Squadron, the University of London Royal Naval Unit and 46F (Kensington) Squadron Air Training Corps.

== Station building ==
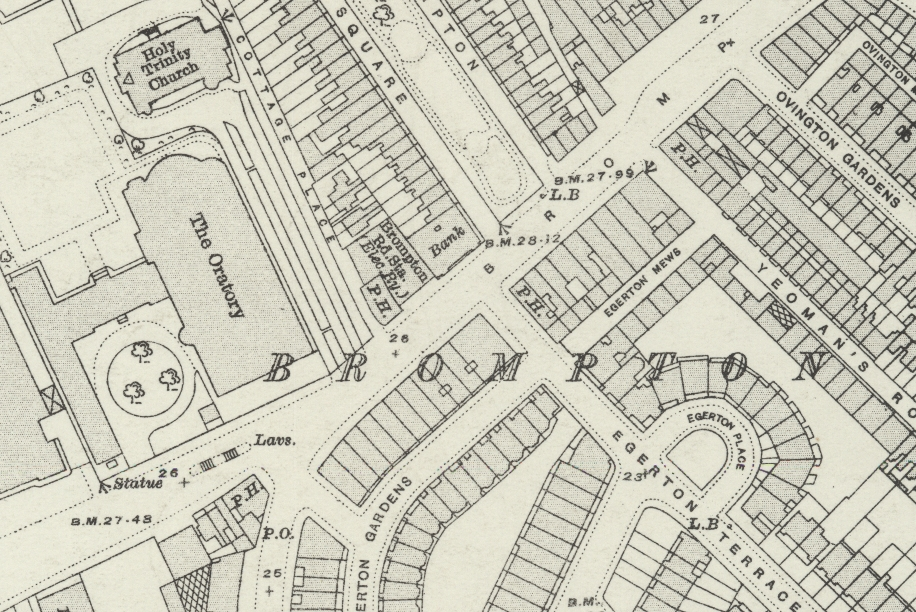
Brompton Road station on a 1915 map

Like the others on the GNP&BR, the station building was designed by Leslie Green. The surface building occupied an L-shaped site built on two adjacent sides of a public house which occupied the corner of Brompton Road and Cottage Place. The façades were of Green's standard red-glazed terracotta design with semi-circular arches at first floor level. The entrance and exits to the lifts were on Brompton Road with the Cottage Place elevation providing staff access. The Brompton Road elevation was demolished in 1972, but the Cottage Place elevation remains, now partly incorporated into a larger building.

Although the platforms have long since been removed, their original location can be seen from passing trains by the brick walls that stand in their place. The original tiling remains on the tunnel walls, although soot and dirt now obscures them.

== Proposals for reuse ==
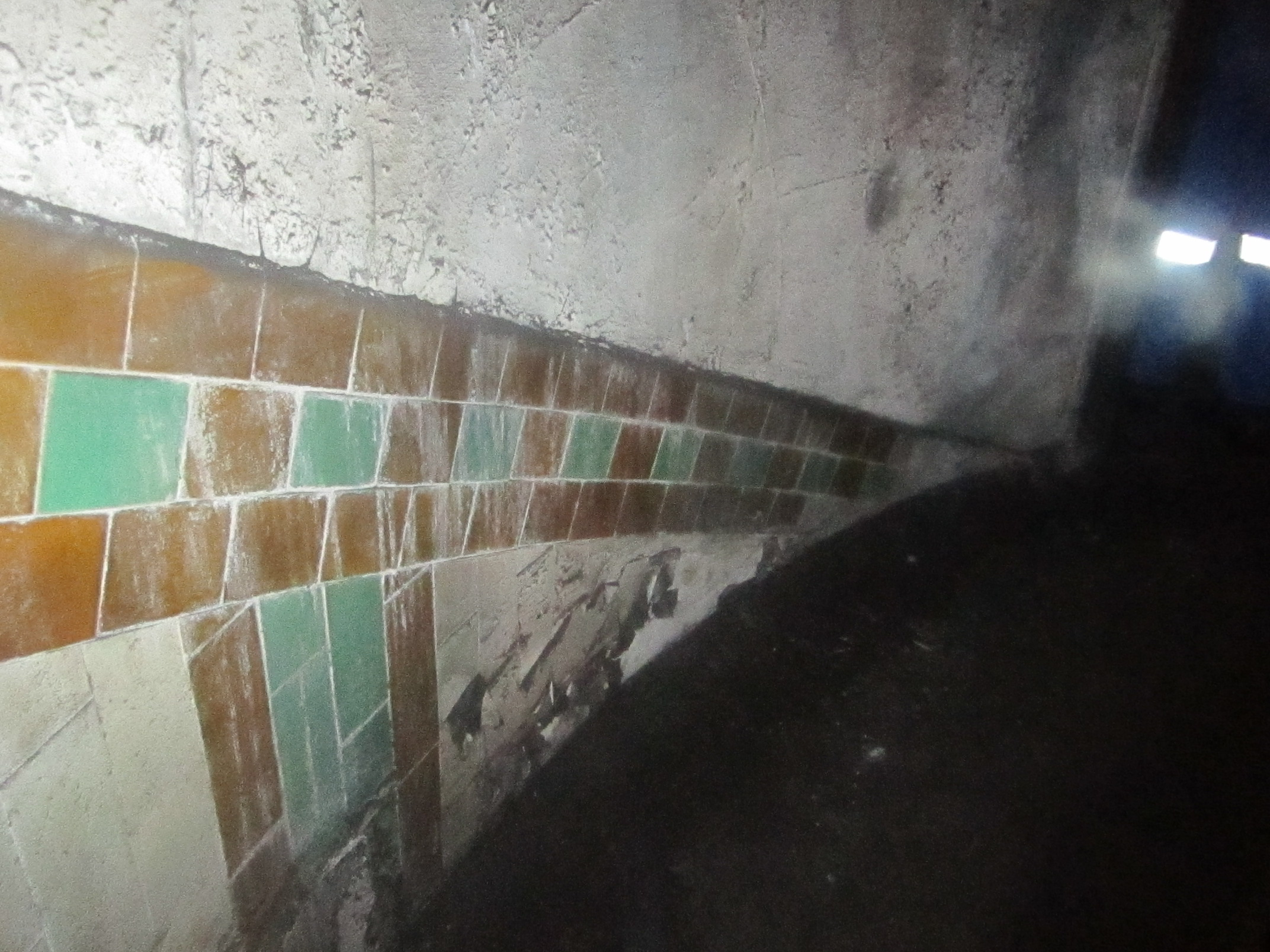
Tiling inside Brompton Road station, 2011

In 2011, proposals from The Old London Underground Company were made suggesting the parts of the station which were used during World War II be opened to the public, with the remainder of the above-ground buildings becoming a restaurant, and the rest of the underground space being turned over to the London Fire Brigade Museum.

In July 2013, the Ministry of Defence announced the site was for sale, with an expected price of about £20 million. The MoD's property surveyor said specialist developers could adapt the 28,000 square feet (2,600 m^{2}) site but stated "a lot of work was needed". In May 2014, the site was sold for £53 million to Dmytro Firtash, a billionaire Ukrainian businessman who claimed an intention to convert it to residential use. The property remained unused as of April 2023.

== In popular culture ==
A 1928 comedy play by Jevan Brandon-Thomas was about a woman who lived near Brompton Road and felt that life was passing her by just as the non-stopping trains were, and so it was titled Passing Brompton Road. The London production starring Marie Tempest ran for 174 performances. (For a 1931 film adaptation, the title was changed to Her Reputation.)

Another play in 2008 used the station. Sailing By, by Anthony Chew, took place on the long-closed platform, where two people sit and talk while Death stalks them.

Preceding station	London Underground	Following station
Former Route
South Kensington towards Uxbridge or Hounslow West	Piccadilly line 1906–1934	Knightsbridge towards Cockfosters or Arnos Grove
