= London Underground stations that are listed buildings =

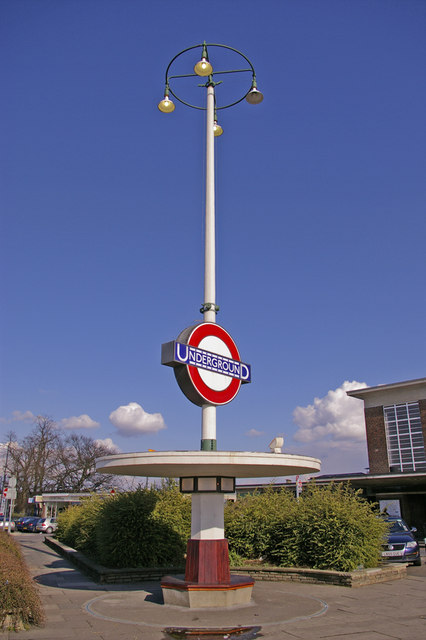
Pylon, London Underground roundel and covered seat was designed by Charles Holden is included in the Grade II* listing for Oakwood Underground station

The London Underground is a metro system serving a large part of Greater London and parts of Buckinghamshire, Hertfordshire and Essex. Seventy-one of the 272 London Underground stations use buildings that are on the Statutory List of Buildings of Special Architectural or Historic Interest, and five have entrances in listed buildings. Buildings are given one of three grades: Grade I for buildings of exceptional interest, Grade II* for particularly important buildings of more than special interest and Grade II for buildings that are of special interest.

The Metropolitan Railway's original seven stations were inspired by Italianate designs, with platforms lit by daylight from above and by gas lights in large glass globes, and the early District Railway stations were similar; on both railways the further from central London the station the simpler the construction. The City & South London Railway's architect Thomas Phillips Figgis designed red-brick buildings topped with a lead-covered dome containing the lift mechanism, such as the Grade II listed station at Kennington. The Central London Railway appointed Harry Bell Measures as architect, who designed its pinkish-brown steel-framed buildings with larger entrances. In the first decade of the 20th century Leslie Green established a house style for the tube stations built by the UERL, which were clad in ox-blood faience blocks; eleven of these stations are listed. Harry Wharton Ford was responsible for the design of at least 17 UERL and District Railway stations, including the listed Barons Court. The Met's architect Charles W Clark had used a neo-classical design for rebuilding Baker Street and Paddington Praed Street stations before World War I and, although the fashion had changed, continued with Farringdon in 1923. In the 1920s and 1930s, Charles Holden designed a series of modernist and art-deco stations, some of which he described as his "brick boxes with concrete lids", many of which are listed, five at Grade II*. Holden's design for the Underground's headquarters building at 55 Broadway including avant-garde sculptures by Jacob Epstein, Eric Gill and Henry Moore, incorporates St James Park station and is listed Grade I.

== Stations ==
| Name | Image | Grade | Lines served | Dates | Architect | Notes | Location |
|---|---|---|---|---|---|---|---|
| Acton Town | | II | District, Piccadilly | 1932 | Charles Holden | Opened in 1879 by the District Railway and rebuilt in 1910, it is the subsequent 1932 Holden building that is listed. This has a lintel on reinforced concrete posts, filled in with red bricks, with shops on either side. | 51°30′10.1″N 0°16′48″W |
| Aldgate East | | II | Hammersmith & City, District | 1884 | Potts, Son and Hennings | North East entrance is within the former Whitechapel library, now an art gallery, which opened in 1892. The entrance to the station was opened in 1937. | 51°30′54.7″N 0°4′19.9″W |
| Aldwych | | II | closed | 1907 | Leslie Green | The station, which closed in 1994, retains the original ticket hall, lift enclosures and tiling on the lower levels. | 51°30′43.7″N 0°6′57.4″W |
| Arnos Grove | | II* | Piccadilly | 1932 | Charles Holden | A largely unaltered highly regarded mature Holden design, this has a tall circular booking hall with large areas of glass and offices on either side. | 51°36′58.7″N 0°8′0.6″W |
| Baker Street | | II* | Circle, Hammersmith & City, Metropolitan, Jubilee, Bakerloo | 1863, rebuilt 1911–13 | John Fowler; Charles W Clark | Fowler designed the Circle line platforms and the station was rebuilt by Clark. Chiltern Court, built above the station in the 1920s, is not included in the listing. | 51°31′19.2″N 0°9′25.2″W |
| Bank | | I | Central, Northern, Waterloo & City | 1898 | | The station has an entrance via the Grade I listed Bank of England main building and a redundant entrance within the Grade I listed church of St Mary Woolnoth. | 51°30′48.6″N 0°5′19.5″W |
| Balham | | II | Northern | 1926 | Charles Holden | Typical of Holden's designs for the stations on the Northern line extension. | 51°26′33.7″N 0°9′7.2″W |
| Barking | | II | District, Hammersmith & City | 1851, rebuilt in 1961 | HH Powell | Rebuilt after the Second World War on bridge over the railway lines. | 51°32′21.5″N 0°4′54.1″E |
| Barkingside | | II | Central | 1903 | William Burgess | Built by the GER, the Central line extension took over the station in 1948. Listing covers the largely unaltered building on the platform. | 51°35′5.3″N 0°5′19.0″E |
| Barons Court | | II | District, Piccadilly | 1905 | Harry Wharton Ford with Leslie Green | Built for the Piccadilly line extension, many original features still exist. | 51°29′26.2″N 0°12′49.0″W |
| Belsize Park | | II | Northern | 1907 | Leslie Green | A typical Green design unusually with a small forecourt. | 51°33′1.1″N 0°9′51.8″W |
| Boston Manor | | II | Piccadilly | 1883, rebuilt 1933–34 | Charles Holden | Original District Railway platforms remain, the station buildings were rebuilt by Holden for the Piccadilly line extension. A tower holds an enamelled London Underground roundel on glazed ceramic tiles. | 51°29′44.9″N 0°19′30″W |
| Bounds Green | | II | Piccadilly | 1932 | Charles Holloway James with Charles Holden | A Holden Sudbury box style station with several unique features. | 51°36′24.8″N 0°7′27.1″W |
| Bow Road | | II | District, Hammersmith & City | 1902 | | Design attributed to C A Brereton, Whitechapel and Bow Railway Engineer. | 51°31′38″N 0°1′29″W |
| Brent Cross | | II | Northern | 1923 | Stanley Heaps | | 51°34′36.1″N 0°12′49.0″W |
| Caledonian Road | | II | Piccadilly | 1906 | Leslie Green | | 51°32′53.9″N 0°7′7″W |
| Chalk Farm | | II | Northern | 1906–7 | Leslie Green | | 51°32′39.1″N 0°9′11.9″W |
| Chesham | | II | Metropolitan | 1889 | | A rural 19th century Metropolitan Railway station, complete with water tower and signal box, that survives largely unaltered. | 51°42′18.7″N 0°36′40.7″W |
| Chiswick Park | | II | District | 1933 | Charles Holden | | 51°29′40.1″N 0°16′4.1″W |
| Clapham Common | | II | Northern | 1924 | Charles Holden | | 51°27′42″N 0°8′16.8″W |
| Clapham South | | II | Northern | 1926 | Charles Holden | Entrance buildings were the first stations to be redesigned by Holden. Listing does not include the later block of flats above the station. | 51°27′10″N 0°8′49.2″W |
| Cockfosters | | II | Piccadilly | 1933 | Charles Holden | Opened for the Piccadilly line extension. | 51°39′5.8″N 0°8′55.7″W |
| Colliers Wood | | II | Northern | 1926 | Charles Holden | Opened for the Northern line extension. | 51°25′5.9″N 0°10′40.8″W |
| Covent Garden | | II | Piccadilly | 1906 | Leslie Green | Office building above the station is not included in the listing. | 51°30′46.8″N 0°7′27.5″W |
| Ealing Common | | II | District, Piccadilly | 1931 | Charles Holden with Stanley Heaps | | 51°30′37″N 0°17′17.1″W |
| Earl's Court | | II | District | 1876; 1906; 1937 | John Wolfe Barry, Harry Wharton Ford | District Railway train shed by Barry, expansions for the Piccadilly line by Ford, and a later entrance on Warwick Road | 51°31′12″N 0°6′19.1″W |
| Eastcote | | II | Metropolitan, Piccadilly | 1936, opened 1939 | Charles Holden | Listing includes shops either side | 51°34′36.1″N 0°23′48.8″W |
| East Finchley | | II | Northern | 1939 | Charles Holden with Leonard Holcombe Bucknell | Opened by the GNR, the Northern took over services in 1939. | 51°35′14″N 0°9′54″W |
| East Ham | | II | District, Hammersmith & City | 1858; 1902 | | | 51°32′20.4″N 0°3′5.8″E |
| Farringdon | | II | Circle, Hammersmith & City, Metropolitan | 1865; 1922 | John Fowler, Charles W Clark | Fowler built the original station before it was re-built by Clark | 51°31′12″N 0°6′19.1″W |
| Fulham Broadway | | II | District | 1880; 1905 | Harry Wharton Ford | A unique station, since 2003 access to the station has been via a nearby shopping arcade. | 51°28′50.2″N 0°11′40.9″W |
| Gloucester Road | | II | Circle, District, Piccadilly | 1868; 1906 | Leslie Green | Piccadilly line expansion by Green not now used by London Underground | 51°29′40.9″N 0°10′58.8″W |
| Great Portland Street | | II | Circle, Hammersmith & City, Metropolitan | c. 1912 – c. 1930s | Charles W Clark | | 51°31′25.7″N 0°8′37.7″W |
| Green Park | | II | Piccadilly, Jubilee, Victoria | 1926 | | The station, which opened in 1906, has entrances via the Grade II listed Devonshire House. | 51°30′24.1″N 0°8′34.1″W |
| Harrow & Wealdstone | | II | Bakerloo | 1875 | | Opened in 1837 by the London & Birmingham Railway, the London & North Western Railway later built the ticket office on platform 1. | 51°35′33″N 0°20′7.8″W |
| Harrow & Wealdstone | | II | Bakerloo | 1912 | Gerald Callcott Horsley | The buildings on the north side of the station were built for the new electric services. | 51°35′33″N 0°20′7.8″W |
| Hendon Central | | II | Northern | 1923 | Stanley Heaps | Part of a larger building not included in the listing | 51°34′58.8″N 0°13′33.6″W |
| Holloway Road | | II | Piccadilly | 1906 | Leslie Green | | 51°33′11.2″N 0°6′42.8″W |
| Hounslow West | | II | Piccadilly | 1884; 1931; 1975 | Charles Holden with Stanley Heaps | Holden and Heaps are responsible for the 1931 ticket hall. Platforms were moved in 1975. | 51°28′25″N 0°23′8″W |
| Kennington | | II | Northern | 1890–1925 | T Phillips Figgis | | 51°29′19″N 0°6′20″W |
| Kew Gardens | | II | District | 1869 | | Station opened in 1869 by the London and South Western Railway, served by the District Railway since 1877. | 51°28′37.6″N 0°17′7.1″W |
| Kilburn Park | | II | Bakerloo | 1914–15 | Probably by Stanley Heaps, after Leslie Green | | 51°32′6.4″N 0°11′38.6″W |
| Leicester Square | | II | Piccadilly, Northern | 1900 | | The station, which opened in 1906, has an entrance via the Grade II listed Hippodrome. | 51°30′41.04″N 0°7′42.24″W |
| Loughton | | II | Central | 1939–40 | John Murray Easton | | 51°34′58.8″N 0°13′33.6″W |
| Maida Vale | | II | Bakerloo | 1914–15 | Probably by Stanley Heaps, after Leslie Green | | 51°31′47.2″N 0°11′8″W |
| Moorgate | | II | Circle, Hammersmith & City, Metropolitan, Northern | 1865, 1900 | Thomas Phillips Figgis | Two entrances are listed: Figgis designed the building in Moorgate | 51°31′7″N 0°5′19″W |
| Moorgate | | II* | Circle, Hammersmith & City, Metropolitan, Northern | 1924–27 | Edwin Lutyens | The grade II* Lutyens house had a station entrance in Finsbury Circus | 51°31′7″N 0°5′19″W |
| Mornington Crescent | | II | Northern | 1907 | Leslie Green | | 51°32′3.8″N 0°8′19″W |
| Newbury Park | | II | Central | 1903/1947 | Oliver Hill (architect) | Built originally 1903 by the Great Eastern Railway, transferred to and rebuilt by London Transport in 1947, Grade II Listing refers to the barrel-vault bus shelter, which opened in 1949, and won a Festival of Britain Award in 1951. | 51°34′32″N 00°05′24″E |
| North Ealing | | II | Piccadilly | 1899; 1903 | | Built 1899 by the District Railway, opened 1903 | 51°29′57.8″N 0°18′51.1″W |
| Northfields | | II | Piccadilly | 1932 | Charles Holden with Stanley Heaps | | 51°31′3″N 0°17′19″W |
| Notting Hill Gate | | II | Circle, District, Central | 1868 | John Fowler | Train shed over the District and Circle line platforms | 51°30′32.4″N 0°11′49.2″W |
| Oakwood | | II* | Piccadilly | 1932–34 | Charles Holden and Charles Holloway James | | 51°38′51″N 0°7′54.1″W |
| Osterley | | II | Piccadilly | 1934 | Stanley Heaps and Charles Holden | | 51°28′53″N 0°21′7.92″W |
| Oxford Circus | | II | Bakerloo, Central, Victoria | 1900, upper storey before 1908 | Harry Bell Measures, Delissa Joseph | Central line entrance built by Measures, with the upper storey by Joseph | 51°30′54.7″N 0°8′29.8″W |
| Oxford Circus | | II | Bakerloo, Central, Victoria | 1906 | Leslie Green | Green designed the Bakerloo line entrance. Office building above is not included in the listing. | 51°30′54.7″N 0°8′29.8″W |
| Paddington (Praed Street) | | II | District, Circle | 1866–68 1915 | John Fowler, Charles W Clark | Fowler built the original Praed Street station before the street building was re-built by Clark | 51°30′56″N 0°10′32″W |
| Park Royal | | II | Piccadilly | 1935–36 | Welch and Lander, inspired by Holden | A replacement for the previous 1903 station 600 metres (660 yd) to the north, this station opened in 1931 and the current building was completed in 1936. Listing covers the station buildings and adjoining flats and shops. | 51°31′36.8″N 0°17′3.1″W |
| Perivale | | II | Central | Designed 1938 completed 1947 | Brian Lewis and Frederick Francis Charles Curtis | A Great Western Railway halt rebuilt for the Central line extension. | 51°32′11.8″N 0°19′23.9″W |
| Piccadilly Circus | | II | Bakerloo, Piccadilly | 1906/7, 1925–8 | Charles Holden | Underground concourse and subways designed by Holden, rebuilt 1925–8. Original Green access buildings demolished in 1990. | 51°30′36.4″N 0°8′2.4″W |
| Rayner's Lane | | II | Metropolitan, Piccadilly | 1938 | Charles Holden and Reginald Uren | Opened in 1906 by the Metropolitan Railway, the Piccadilly line was extended in 1933. Listing includes station with shops and platforms. | 51°34′31.1″N 0°22′17.0″W |
| Redbridge | | II | Central | Designed 1935–38, opened 1947 | Charles Holden | One of Holden's last designs, the unopened tunnels were used as an aircraft component factory during World War II and the design was altered due to post-war austerity measures. | 51°34′32.6″N 0°2′41.6″E |
| Ruislip | | II | Metropolitan, Piccadilly | 1904, modified 1928 | | Opened in 1904 by the Metropolitan Railway, the Piccadilly line was extended in 1933. A largely unaltered Metropolitan Railway country station. | 51°34′17.0″N 0°25′16.0″W |
| Russell Square | | II | Piccadilly | 1906 | Leslie Green | Lower levels largely unaltered. | 51°31′23.2″N 0°7′27.8″W |
| South Kensington | | II | Circle, District, Piccadilly | 1867–68, substantially altered 1907. | John Fowler, altered by George Cambell Sherrin | Sherrin designed the Edwardian shopping arcade, listing includes the subway to the museums. | 51°29′38.8″N 0°10′25.7″W |
| South Wimbledon | | II | Northern | 1926 | Charles Holden | Built out of Portland stone, with a curved facade on a corner site, for the Northern line extension to Morden. | 51°24′56″N 0°11′27.6″W |
| Southgate | | II* | Piccadilly | 1933 | Charles Holden | Designed with a matching shopping arcade and bus station, retains many original features. | 51°37′57″N 0°7′41.0″W |
| St James's Park | | I | Circle, District | 1927–9 | Charles Holden | 55 Broadway, the headquarters of the UERL and incorporating St James Park station, was rebuilt by Holden. | 51°29′57.8″N 0°8′3.8″W |
| St John's Wood | | II | Jubilee | 1939 | Stanley Heaps | Includes a replica Harold Stabler tiles scheme. Apartment block built above in 1963 not included. | 51°32′4.9″N 0°10′27.1″W |
| Sudbury Hill | | II | Piccadilly | 1931 | Charles Holden with Stanley Heaps | Rebuilt for the Piccadilly line extension. | 51°33′2.9″N 0°18′56.2″W |
| Sudbury Town | | II* | Piccadilly | 1930–1 | Charles Holden | Rebuilt for the Piccadilly line extension, this was the prototype for Holden's 'Sudbury box' modernist designs for the Piccadilly line extensions. | 51°33′2.9″N 0°18′56.2″W |
| Tooting Bec | | II | Northern | 1926 | Charles Holden | Built for the Northern line extension to Morden with two entrances constructed out of Portland stone. Original tiled decoration still present on sub-surface passages and platforms. | 51°26′9″N 0°9′32.4″W |
| Tooting Broadway | | II | Northern | 1926 | Charles Holden | Built for the Northern line extension to Morden with a curved facade made from Portland stone. Original tiled decoration still present on sub-surface passages and platforms. | 51°25′40″N 0°10′4.8″W |
| Turnpike Lane | | II | Piccadilly | 1932 | Charles Holden | Opened for the Piccadilly line extension. | 51°35′25.4″N 0°6′10.1″W |
| Uxbridge | | II | Metropolitan, Piccadilly | 1938 | Charles Holden with Leonard Holcombe Bucknell | A concave station frontage and shops with a red brick facade. Platforms covered by concrete arches with sloped clerestory windows. | 51°32′45.2″N 0°28′41.9″W |
| Watford | | II | Metropolitan | c. 1925 | Charles W Clark | Brick built in domestic style to set the tone for the local Metro-land development | 51°39′27″N 0°25′3″W |
| West Acton | | II | Central | 1930s | Brian Lewis | Built by the Great Western Railway for the Central line extension. The concrete ticket hall, faced in brick with a full-height window on the front back, is on a bridge over the two platforms. | 51°31′5.16″N 0°16′50.9″W |
| West Brompton | | II | District | 1869 | John Fowler | Best preserved example of a District Railway station. | 51°29′11.8″N 0°11′44.5″W |
| Willesden Green | | II | Jubilee | 1879; 1925 | Charles W Clark | Street buildings were re-built by Clark for the Metropolitan Railway with his cream terracotta facade. Services currently provided by the Jubilee line. | 51°32′57.1″N 0°13′18.1″W |
| Wood Green | | II | Piccadilly | 1932 | Charles Holden | Holden was constrained at Wood Green by the limited size of the corner site, and therefore used a different design than his other Piccadilly line stations of the early 1930s. | 51°35′49.2″N 0°6′36″W |

== See also ==
- List of London Underground stations
