= Alperton tube station =

London Underground station

Alperton
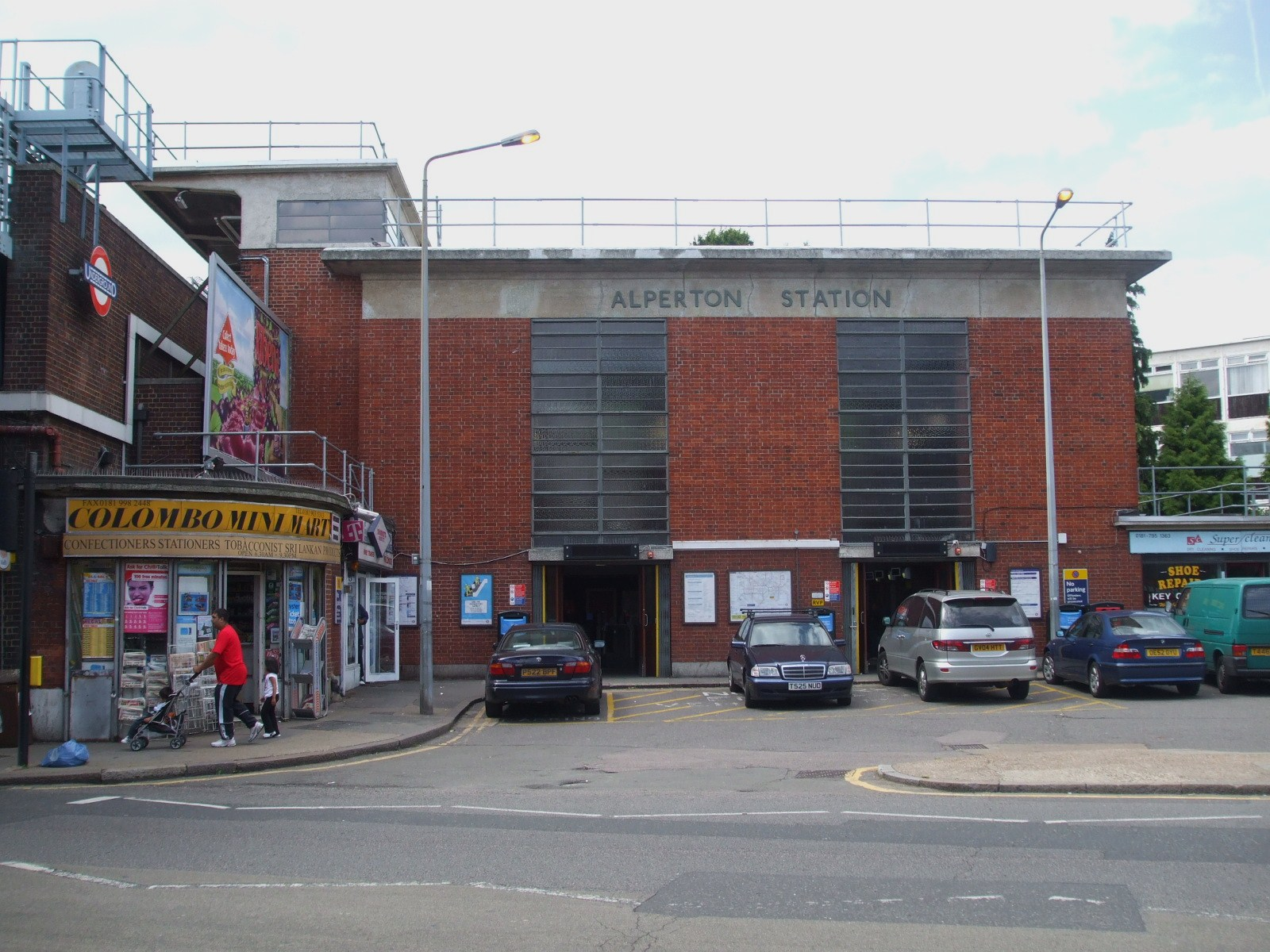
- Station building
- Interactive map of Alperton

General information
- Location: Alperton
- Local authority: London Borough of Brent
- Managed by: London Underground
- Number of platforms: 2
- Fare zone: 4

London Underground annual entry and exit
- 2020: ▼2.06 million
- 2021: ▼1.35 million
- 2022: ▲2.30 million
- 2023: ▲2.60 million
- 2024: ▼2.49 million

Railway companies
- Original company: District Railway

Key dates
- 28 June 1903: Opened as Perivale-Alperton
- 7 October 1910: Renamed Alperton
- 4 July 1932: District line service replaced by Piccadilly line

Other information
- External links: TfL station info page
- Coordinates: 51.54083°N 0.29972°W

Alperton is a London Underground station in Alperton, north-west London. It is on the Uxbridge branch of the Piccadilly line, between Sudbury Town and Park Royal stations. It is in London fare zone 4.

The station is located on Ealing Road (A4089), a short distance from the junction with Bridgewater Road (A4005), and is close to the Paddington branch of the Grand Union Canal.

== History ==
Alperton was opened on 28 June 1903 by the District Railway (now the District line), with its name being "Perivale Alperton", on its new extension to South Harrow on electrified tracks from Park Royal & Twyford Abbey, which it was opened five days earlier. This new extension was, together with the existing tracks back to Acton Town, the first section of the Underground's surface lines to be electrified and operate electric traction instead of steam. The deep-level tube lines open at that time (City & South London Railway, Waterloo & City Railway and Central London Railway) had been electrically powered from the start.

The station was subsequently renamed "Alperton" on 7 October 1910.

On 4 July 1932, from Ealing Common to South Harrow, the District line service was replaced by the Piccadilly line. Piccadilly line services were extended to run west of its original terminus at Hammersmith, sharing the route with the District. It non-stops stations between Hammersmith and Acton Town, apart from Turnham Green, which the Piccadilly only calls during early mornings and late evenings. At Acton Town, the District and Piccadilly lines use separate platforms. They join back west of Acton Town towards Ealing Common.

The station was refurbished in 2006.

In June 2025 it was announced that the station will get two lifts added and should be in use by Summer 2027.

=== Incidents and accidents ===
On 2 March 1944 during the Second World War, bomb damage prevented through services to and from Uxbridge for five days.

== Design ==
The original station building was a modest timber-framed structure built in 1910. In 1930 and 1931, this was demolished and replaced by a new station in preparation for the handover of the branch from the District line to the Piccadilly line. The new station was designed by Charles Holden in a modern European style using brick, reinforced concrete and glass.

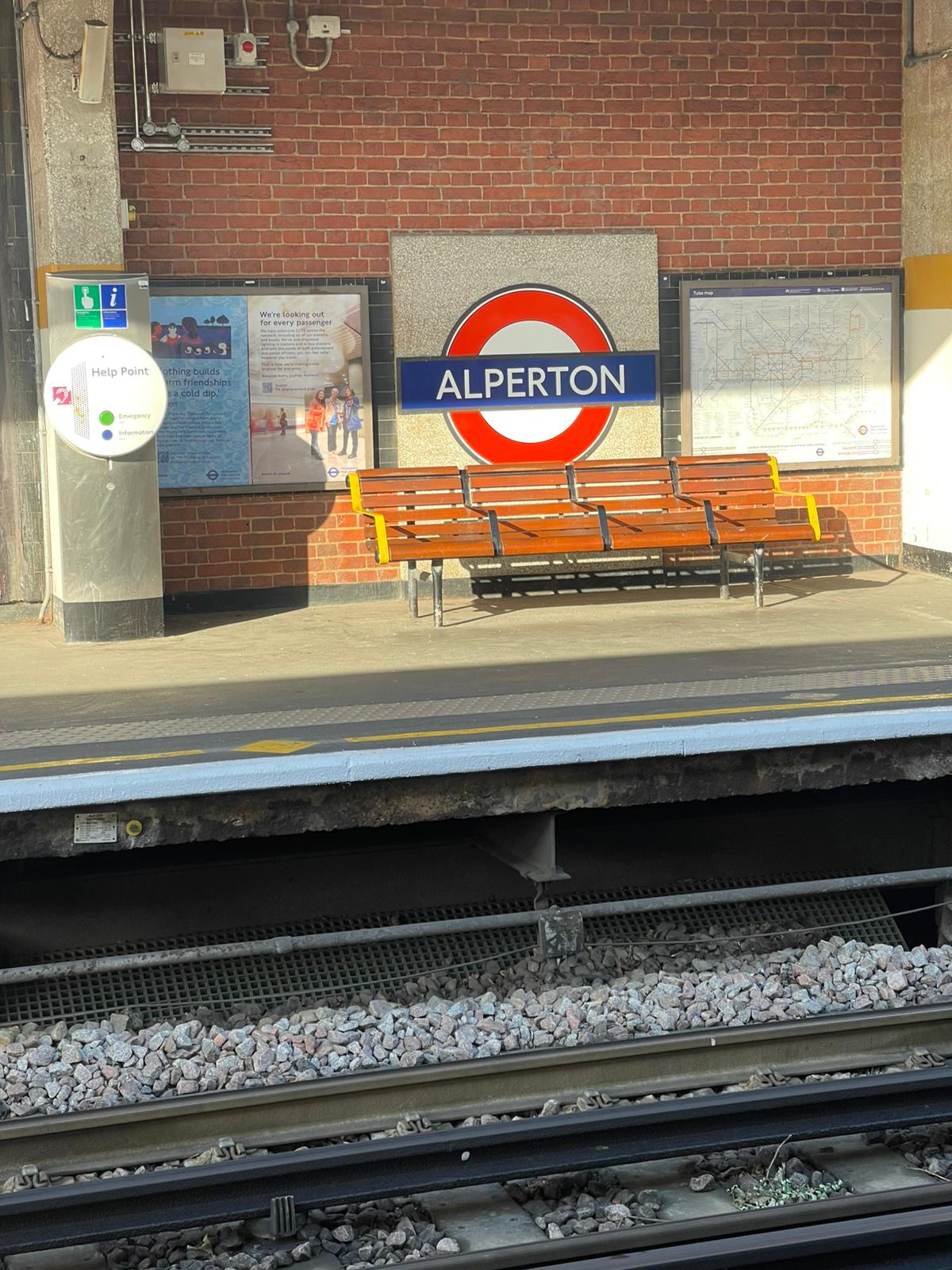
Alperton Station

Like other stations such as Sudbury Town and Sudbury Hill to the north and others that Holden designed elsewhere, and also for the east and west Piccadilly line extensions such as Acton Town and Oakwood, Alperton station features a tall block-like ticket hall rising above a low horizontal structure that contains station offices and shops. The brick walls of the ticket hall are punctuated with panels of clerestory windows and the structure is capped with a flat concrete slab roof. Alperton formerly shared with Greenford (on the Central line) the distinction of being one of the only two stations to have an escalator going up to the platforms. (Note: Greenford had the wooden up escalators, which was removed in 2014 to fit in new inclined lifts for step-free access. The left staircase will be replaced by an up escalator.) In 1955, an up escalator was installed to the eastbound platform. It had originally been used at the South Bank exhibition of the Festival of Britain. The escalator fell out of use in 1988, and its machine remains in place behind a wall.

== Services ==
Alperton station is on the Uxbridge branch of the Piccadilly line in London fare zone 4. It is between Sudbury Town to the west and Park Royal to the east.

The off-peak service in trains per hour (tph) is:

- 6 tph to Cockfosters (Eastbound)
- 3 tph to Rayners Lane (Westbound)
- 3 tph to Uxbridge via Rayners Lane (Westbound)

The peak time service in trains per hour (tph) is:

- 12 tph to Cockfosters (Eastbound)
- 6 tph to Rayners Lane (Westbound)
- 6 tph to Uxbridge via Rayners Lane (Westbound)

During disruption on the District line, Piccadilly line trains have sometimes been used to provide a service to Ealing Broadway, either by diverting some trains bound for Rayners Lane and Uxbridge, or as a shuttle from Acton Town. Trains may also run along the District tracks from Hammersmith to Acton Town in order to serve those stations with no platforms on the Piccadilly line.

Preceding station	London Underground	Following station
Sudbury Town towards Uxbridge or Rayners Lane	Piccadilly line Uxbridge branch	Park Royal towards Cockfosters or Arnos Grove
Former services
Preceding station	London Underground	Following station
Sudbury Town towards South Harrow or Uxbridge	District line (1903–1931)	Park Royal & Twyford Abbey towards Upminster
Sudbury Town towards South Harrow or Uxbridge	District line (1931–1932)	Park Royal towards Upminster

== Connections ==
Various day and nighttime London Buses routes serve the station.

== Notes and references ==
=== Bibliography ===
- Cherry, Bridget; Pevsner, Nikolaus (1991). London 3: North West. The Buildings of England. Yale University Press. ISBN 978-0-300-09652-1.
- Horne, Mike (2007). The Piccadilly Tube – A History of the First Hundred Years. London: Capital Transport. ISBN 978-1-85414-305-1.
