= Ealing station =

Ealing station may refer to several railway stations in London:

- Ealing Broadway station on the Great Western Railway and the terminus for London Underground's Central and District lines
- Ealing Common tube station on the London Underground District line and Piccadilly line Uxbridge Branch
- North Ealing tube station on the London Underground Piccadilly Line Uxbridge Branch
- South Ealing tube station on the London Underground Piccadilly Line Heathrow Branch
- West Ealing railway station on the Great Western Railway
