= Park Royal tube station =

London Underground station

Park Royal
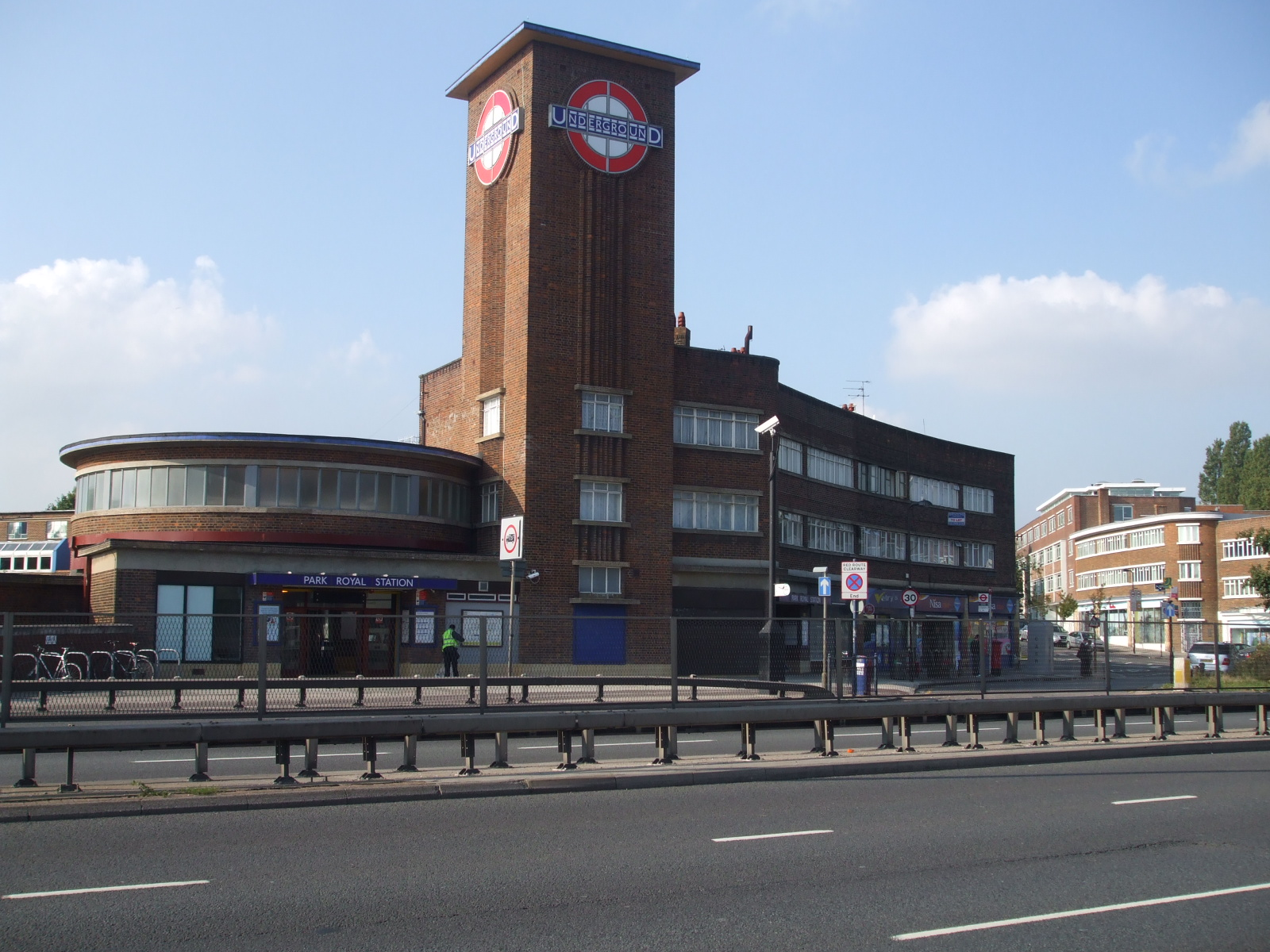
- Station building
- Interactive map of Park Royal

General information
- Location: Park Royal
- Local authority: London Borough of Ealing
- Managed by: London Underground
- Number of platforms: 2
- Fare zone: 3
- OSI: Hanger Lane

London Underground annual entry and exit
- 2020: ▼1.25 million
- 2021: ▼0.92 million
- 2022: ▲1.65 million
- 2023: 1.65 million
- 2024: ▲1.72 million

Railway companies
- Original company: District Railway

Key dates
- 6 July 1931: Station opened as Park Royal
- 4 July 1932: District line service replaced by Piccadilly line
- 1 March 1936: Renamed Park Royal (Hanger Hill)
- 1947: Renamed Park Royal

Listed status
- Listing grade: II
- Entry number: 1079328
- Added to list: 15 October 1987; 38 years ago

Other information
- External links: TfL station info page
- Coordinates: 51.52694°N 0.28417°W

Park Royal is a London Underground station. It is on the Uxbridge branch of the Piccadilly line, between Alperton and North Ealing stations. It is in London fare zone 3.

The station is situated on the south side of the east–west Western Avenue (A40), surrounded by residential Ealing and industrial Park Royal. There is a pedestrian subway under the A40 road near the station. Park Royal is within walking distance from Hanger Lane tube station on the Central line.

The station's platforms have a continuous significant gradient (sloping up from south to north).

== History ==
The District Railway (DR, now the District line) opened the line through Park Royal on its new extension to South Harrow on 23 June 1903. A station, Park Royal & Twyford Abbey, was opened at that time a short distance to the north of the current station to serve the Royal Agricultural Society's recently opened Park Royal show grounds.

The current station was built for the extension of Piccadilly line services over the District line tracks to South Harrow. It opened on 6 July 1931 and replaced the earlier station which closed on the previous day.

First opened as a temporary timber structure, the current station building was designed by Welch & Lander in an Art Deco/Streamline Moderne style influenced by the Underground's principal architect Charles Holden. The station buildings are formed from a series of simple interconnecting geometric shapes. Plain red brick masses are accented with strong horizontal and vertical glazed elements. A large circular ticket hall with high level windows gives access to the platform stairs. The enclosures for these form cascades of glazed steps down to the platforms.

The most prominent feature of the station building is the tall square tower adjacent to the ticket hall. This is adorned with the Underground roundel; and represents a visible locator for the station from some distance. The permanent structure was opened in 1936. Attached to the station building and across the small open space of Hanger Green are two curved three-storey retail and office buildings built in the same style as the station.

On 4 July 1932, the Piccadilly line was extended to run west of its original terminus at Hammersmith sharing the route with the District line to Ealing Common. From Ealing Common to South Harrow, the District line was replaced by the Piccadilly line.

From 1 March 1936 until 1947 the station name was modified to Park Royal (Hanger Hill). The suffix was then dropped and the station returned to the unmodified version. Hanger Hill referred to a residential estate adjacent to the station.

In August 2022 a woman died when the Range Rover she was travelling in crashed through a barrier, hit another vehicle and ended up on Piccadilly line tracks at Park Royal Tube station. The driver and another female passenger were injured also taken to hospital. The driver Rida Kazem admitted causing death by dangerous driving and was jailed.

== Possible development ==
The Mayor's plans for the area include improvements to the station access. In 2018, it was announced that the station would gain step free access by 2022, as part of a £200m investment to increase the number of accessible stations on the Tube.

The developers of the First Central business park at Park Royal were planning a new station between North Acton and Hanger Lane on the Central line. This would have served the business park and provide a walking distance interchange with Park Royal station. This is not being actively pursued. London Underground has said that the transport benefits of a Park Royal station on the Central line are not sufficiently high to justify the costs of construction.

== Services ==
Park Royal station is on the Uxbridge branch of the Piccadilly line in London fare zone 3. It is between Alperton to the west and North Ealing to the east.

The off-peak service in trains per hour (tph) is:

- 6 tph to Cockfosters (Eastbound)
- 3 tph to Rayners Lane (Westbound)
- 3 tph to Uxbridge via Rayners Lane (Westbound)

The peak time service in trains per hour (tph) is:

- 12 tph to Cockfosters (Eastbound)
- 6 tph to Rayners Lane (Westbound)
- 6 tph to Uxbridge via Rayners Lane (Westbound)

Preceding station	London Underground	Following station
Alperton towards Uxbridge or Rayners Lane	Piccadilly line Uxbridge branch	North Ealing towards Cockfosters or Arnos Grove
Former services
Alperton towards South Harrow or Uxbridge	District line (1931–1932)	North Ealing towards Upminster

== Connections ==
London Buses routes serve the station.
