= Ealing tube station =

Ealing tube station could refer to one of a number of London Underground stations serving the Ealing area of west London:

- North Ealing
- Ealing Common
- South Ealing
- Ealing Broadway
