= Sudbury Hill tube station =

London Underground station

Sudbury Hill
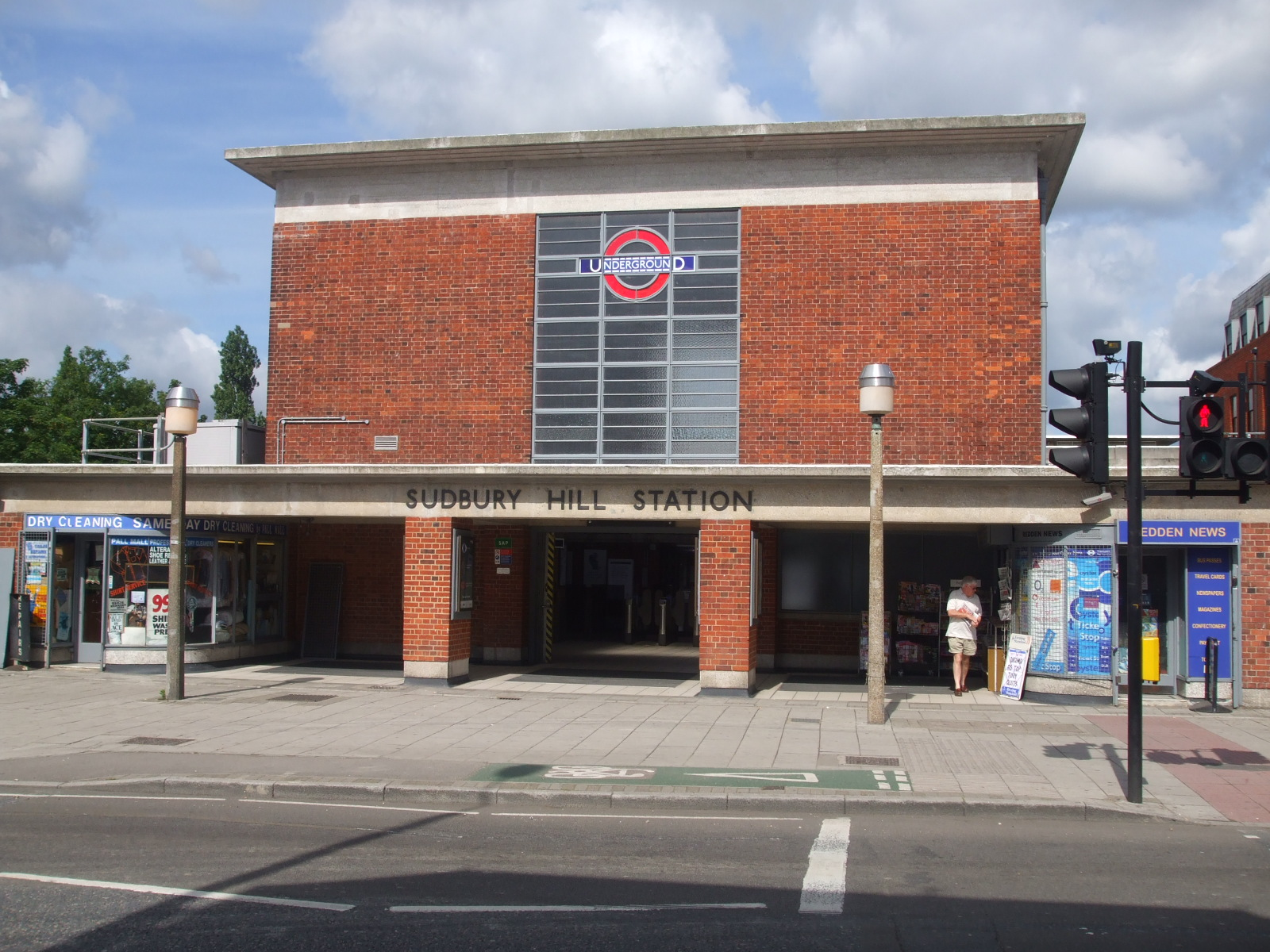
- Station entrance
- Interactive map of Sudbury Hill

General information
- Location: Sudbury
- Local authority: London Borough of Harrow
- Managed by: London Underground
- Number of platforms: 2
- Accessible: Yes
- Fare zone: 4
- OSI: Sudbury Hill Harrow

London Underground annual entry and exit
- 2020: ▼1.45 million
- 2021: ▼0.89 million
- 2022: ▲1.51 million
- 2023: ▲1.63 million
- 2024: ▲1.70 million

Key dates
- 28 June 1903: Opened (DR)
- 4 July 1932: Start (Piccadilly line)
- 4 July 1932: End (District line)

Listed status
- Listing grade: II
- Entry number: 1254171
- Added to list: 17 May 1994; 32 years ago

Other information
- External links: TfL station info page
- Coordinates: 51.55694°N 0.33639°W

Sudbury Hill is a London Underground station in Sudbury, north-west London. It is on the Uxbridge branch of the Piccadilly line, between South Harrow and Sudbury Town stations. It is in London fare zone 4.

The station is located on Greenford Road (A4127) north of the junction with Whitton Avenue, on the border between the London Boroughs of Harrow and Ealing. It is close to Sudbury Hill Harrow railway station.

== History ==
Sudbury Hill station was opened on 28 June 1903 by the District Railway (DR, now the District line) on its new extension to South Harrow from Park Royal & Twyford Abbey.

This new extension was, together with the existing tracks back to Acton Town, the first section of the Underground's surface lines to be electrified and operate electric instead of steam trains. The deep-level tube lines open at that time (City & South London Railway, Waterloo & City Railway and Central London Railway) had been electrically powered from the start.

The original station building was demolished in 1930 and 1931 and replaced by a new station in preparation for the handover of the branch from the District line to the Piccadilly line. The new station was designed by Charles Holden in a modern European style using brick, reinforced concrete and glass. Like the stations at Sudbury Town and Alperton to the south as well as others that Holden designed elsewhere for the east and west Piccadilly line extensions such as Acton Town and Oakwood, Sudbury Hill station features a tall block-like ticket hall rising above a low horizontal structure that contains station facilities and shops. The brick walls of the ticket hall are punctuated with panels of clerestory windows and the structure is capped with a flat concrete slab roof.

On 4 July 1932 the Piccadilly line was extended to run west of its original terminus at Hammersmith sharing the route with the District line to Ealing Common. From Ealing Common to South Harrow, the District line was replaced by the Piccadilly line.

The station was made a Grade II Listed Building on 17 May 1994.

In 2018, it was announced that the station would gain step free access by 2022, as part of a £200m investment to increase the number of accessible stations on the Tube. This was achieved on 30 December 2021 with the installation of two lifts.

== Services ==
Sudbury Hill station is on the Uxbridge branch of the Piccadilly line in London fare zone 4. It is between South Harrow to the west and Sudbury Town to the east.

The off-peak service in trains per hour (tph) is:

- 6 tph to Cockfosters (Eastbound)
- 3 tph to Rayners Lane (Westbound)
- 3 tph to Uxbridge via Rayners Lane (Westbound)

The peak time service in trains per hour (tph) is:

- 12 tph to Cockfosters (Eastbound)
- 6 tph to Rayners Lane (Westbound)
- 6 tph to Uxbridge via Rayners Lane (Westbound)

Preceding station	London Underground	Following station
South Harrow towards Uxbridge or Rayners Lane	Piccadilly line Uxbridge branch	Sudbury Town towards Cockfosters or Arnos Grove
Former services
Preceding station	London Underground	Following station
South Harrow towards South Harrow or Uxbridge	District line (1903–1932)	Sudbury Town towards Upminster

== Connections ==
London Buses routes serve the station day and night.

== See also ==
- Sudbury Hill Harrow Station
- Sudbury & Harrow Road Station
