= Sudbury Town tube station =

London Underground station

Sudbury Town
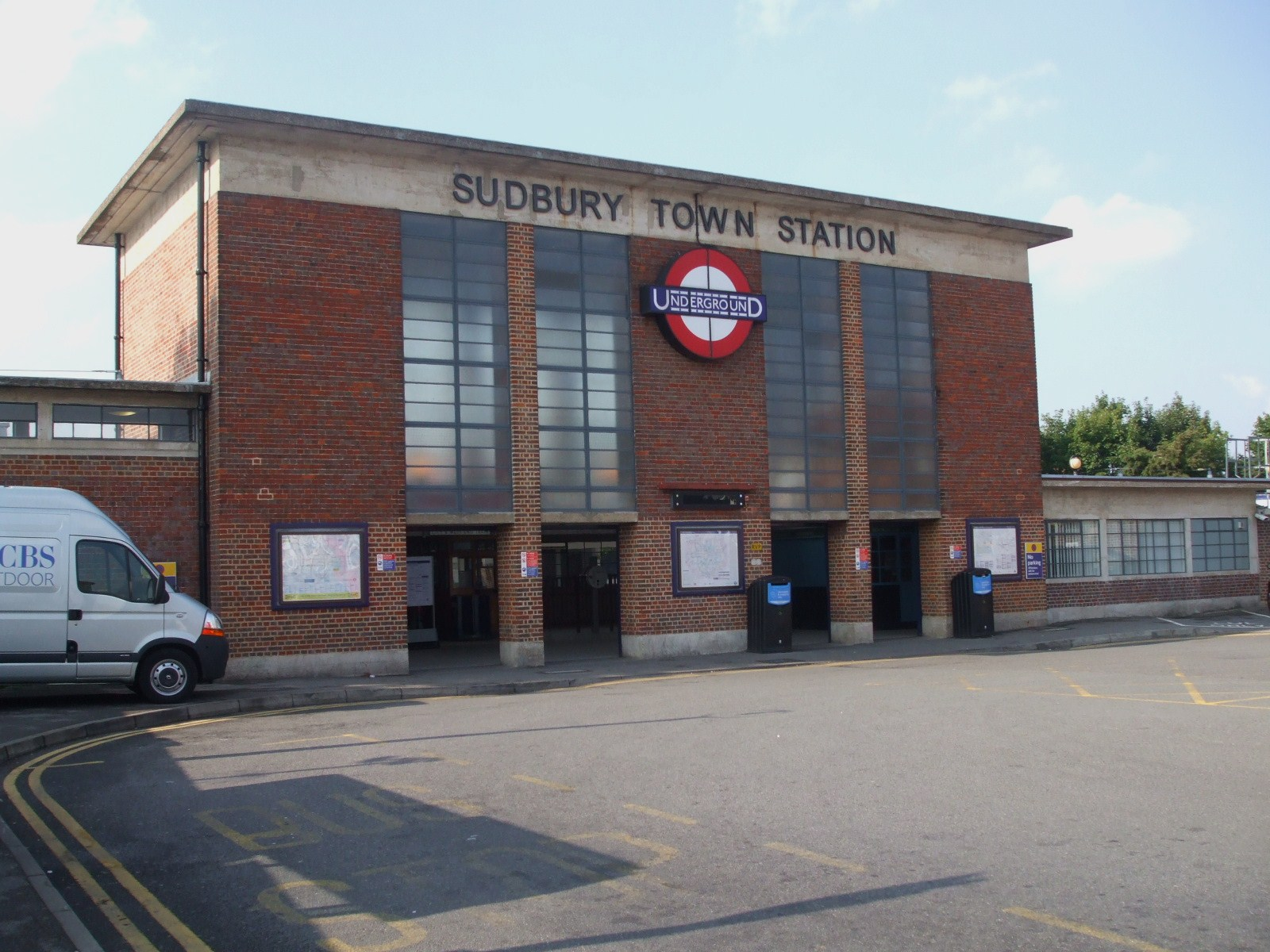
- Station entrance
- Interactive map of Sudbury Town

General information
- Location: Sudbury
- Local authority: London Borough of Brent
- Managed by: London Underground
- Number of platforms: 2
- Accessible: Yes
- Fare zone: 4

London Underground annual entry and exit
- 2020: ▼1.28 million
- 2021: ▼0.84 million
- 2022: ▲1.39 million
- 2023: ▲1.56 million
- 2024: ▲1.67 million

Railway companies
- Original company: District Railway

Key dates
- 28 June 1903: Station opened
- 4 July 1932: District line service replaced by Piccadilly line

Listed status
- Listing grade: II* (since 20 July 2011)
- Entry number: 1294594
- Added to list: 19 February 1971; 55 years ago

Other information
- External links: TfL station info page
- Coordinates: 51.55083°N 0.31556°W

Sudbury Town (/ˈsʌdbəri/) is a London Underground station. It is located on the border between the London Boroughs of Brent and Ealing, with its main entrance on Station Approach in Sudbury. The station is on the Uxbridge branch of the Piccadilly line, between Sudbury Hill and Alperton stations. The forecourt of the station is known as Station Crescent. The station serves Sudbury, which forms the western part of Wembley. It is in London fare zone 4.

Sudbury & Harrow Road National Rail station is located around 350 metres to the north, while Wembley Central station is around 1 km to the east.

== History ==
Sudbury Town station was opened on 28 June 1903 by the District Railway (DR, now the District line) on its new extension to South Harrow from Park Royal & Twyford Abbey.

This new extension was, together with the existing tracks back to Acton Town, the first section of the Underground's surface lines to be electrified and operate electric instead of steam trains. The Deep level tube lines open at that time (City & South London Railway, Waterloo & City Railway and Central London Railway) had been electrically powered from the start.

The original station building was demolished in 1930 and 1931 and replaced by a new station in preparation for the handover of the branch from the District line to the Piccadilly line. The new station was designed by Charles Holden in a modern European style using brick, reinforced concrete and glass. Like the stations at Sudbury Hill to the north and Alperton to the south as well as others that Holden designed elsewhere for the east and west Piccadilly line extensions such as Acton Town and Oakwood, Sudbury Town station features a tall block-like ticket hall rising above a low horizontal structure that contains station facilities and shops. The brick walls of the ticket hall are punctuated with panels of clerestory windows and the structure is capped with a flat concrete slab roof. Sudbury Town station is a Grade II* listed building. Some of the original station signage uses the Johnston Delf Smith typeface, a wedge-serif variation of the standard London Underground Johnston typeface.

On 4 July 1932, the Piccadilly line was extended to run west of its original terminus at Hammersmith sharing the route with the District line to Ealing Common. From Ealing Common to South Harrow, the District line was replaced by the Piccadilly line.

The station was updated in 1986, in consultation with the Wembley History Society, the Thirties Society and GLC.

== Services ==
Sudbury Town station is on the Uxbridge branch of the Piccadilly line in London fare zone 4. It is between Sudbury Hill to the west and Alperton to the east.

The off-peak service in trains per hour (tph) is:

- 6 tph to Cockfosters (Eastbound)
- 3 tph to Rayners Lane (Westbound)
- 3 tph to Uxbridge via Rayners Lane (Westbound)

The peak time service in trains per hour (tph) is:

- 12 tph to Cockfosters (Eastbound)
- 6 tph to Rayners Lane (Westbound)
- 6 tph to Uxbridge via Rayners Lane (Westbound)

Preceding station	London Underground	Following station
Sudbury Hill towards Uxbridge or Rayners Lane	Piccadilly line Uxbridge branch	Alperton towards Cockfosters or Arnos Grove
Former services
Preceding station	London Underground	Following station
Sudbury Hill towards South Harrow or Uxbridge	District line (1903–1932)	Alperton towards Upminster

== Connections ==
Various London Buses routes serve the station.
