= Charles Hutton (architect) =

English architect (1905–1995)

- Born: Charles William Hutton; 28 July 1905; Annan, Dumfries and Galloway
- Died: 11 September 1995 (aged 90); Williton, Somerset
- Occupation: Architect
- Practice: Richard Hermon Crook; Adams, Holden & Pearson; Charles Hutton

Charles William Hutton FRIBA (28 July 1905 – 11 September 1995) was an architect and former master of the Art Workers' Guild, who was known best for his work with Charles Holden on the London Underground. Arnos Grove tube station and the former Murphy Radio factory in Welwyn Garden City are regarded as some of his best work.

== Early years ==
Hutton was born in Annan, Dumfries and Galloway on the 28 July 1905. His father was an engineer and his early life saw him live in Sheffield, Glasgow and Bolton. Hutton attended Bellahouston Academy, before gaining employment at Richard Herman Crook's architecture practice in Bolton. During his time at Crook's practice, Hutton won a scholarship with the School of Architecture at the University of Liverpool under the tutorial of Sir Charles Reilly. While still at University, Hutton won a competition in 1926 to design a First World War memorial at Rawmarsh in Yorkshire, which showed influences of both his tutor Reilly and his future boss, Charles Holden. Hutton graduated from his Bachelor of Architecture in 1928.

Hutton's first job after university was at the practice of C. H. Mewes in France. While there he started the design for the home of François Coty but had returned to England before the building was completed. Upon his return to England in 1929, Hutton joined the practice of Adams, Holden & Pearson, becoming chief assistant to Charles Holden which he remained until 1936. During his time with Holden, he worked on many of the London Underground station designs. Due to Holden's workload, he would do a rough sketch and pass it to Hutton to do the practical detail. Hutton did most of the detailing at Arnos Grove tube station and Osterley tube station, including changing the construction method at Arnos Grove due to issues with the roof that had arisen at Sudbury Town tube station. Hutton was also responsible for the detailing and perspective drawings of Senate House, London that Holden designed.

In 1936, Hutton returned to teach at the School of Architecture at the University of Liverpool as well as at the renowned Architectural Association School of Architecture. However, during the war he became deputy to William Holford, Baron Holford designing ordnance factories at Kirkby, Walsall and Wolverhampton.

== Later career ==
In 1944 Hutton opened his own practice in Welwyn Garden City, which would eventually move to Hammersmith in 1946. Hutton would retire from his practice in 1986 at the age of 81. He would still continue to teach at the University of Liverpool until 1989.

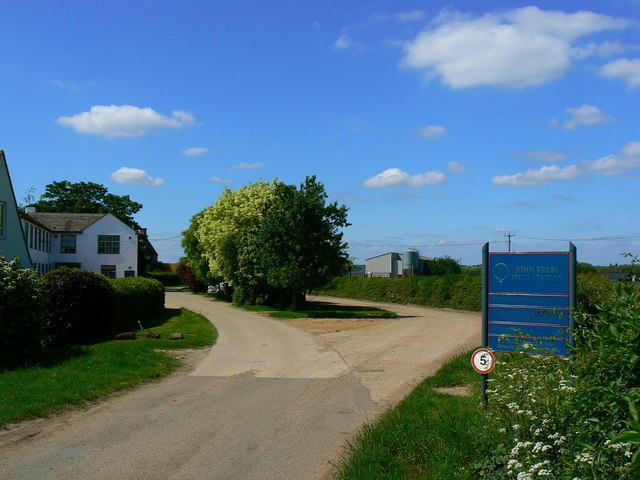
John Kreb Field Station in Wytham

At his own practice he designed buildings for Murphy Radio at Welwyn Garden City; buildings for the Danish Bacon Company; the University of Oxford farm (now John Krebs Field Station) at Wytham; buildings for the Wellcome Trust, the Social Club at the Guinness Brewery at Alperton and schools for Berkshire County Council.

In 1951, Hutton was elected to the Art Workers' Guild, and held the roles of treasurer, trustee and secretary, even continuing till 1988 as Honorary Architect. He was honoured by his fellow members by being selected to be the Master of the Guild in 1968. Hutton also shared his knowledge and experience by serving on BSI committees, acting as a RIBA representative on the boards of Wimbledon College of Arts and Kingston School of Art, and as an adviser to the National Council for Voluntary Organisations on designs for village halls.

== Personal life ==
Hutton was married twice. His first marriage was in 1932 to Nora Maxwell, with whom he had a daughter. The marriage was dissolved in 1950. In 1951 he later married Fairlie Bruce, with whom he had three daughters. When he retired, he moved to Somerset. His drawings and writings were donated to the RIBA and are held there on behalf of the National Archive.

He was a skilled cabinet maker and metal worker, and kept active right into later life, still running up stairs three at a time when 75.
