= Barons Court tube station =

London Underground station

Barons Court
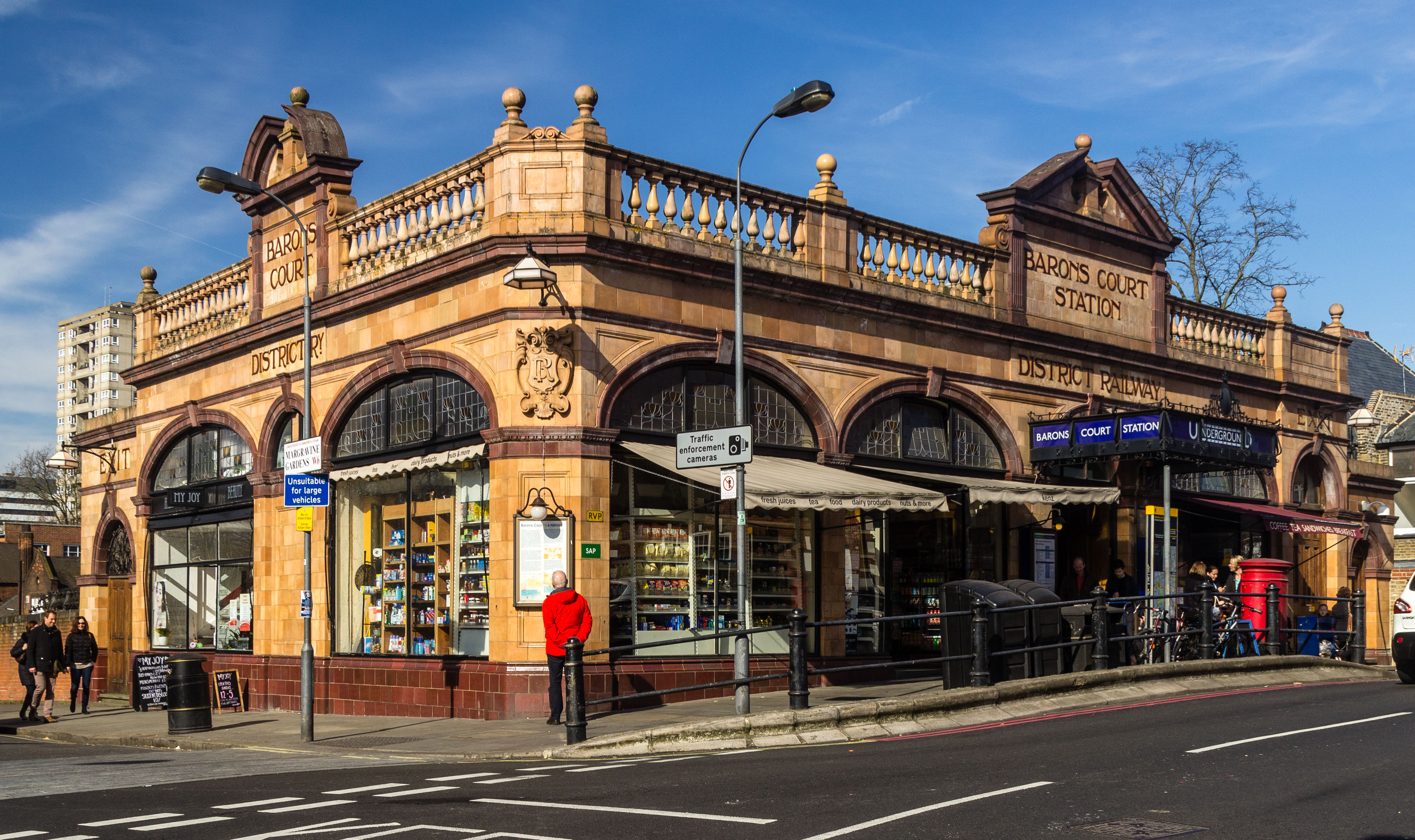
- Station building
- Interactive map of Barons Court

General information
- Location: West Kensington
- Local authority: Hammersmith & Fulham
- Managed by: London Underground
- Number of platforms: 4
- Fare zone: 2

London Underground annual entry and exit
- 2021: ▼2.90 million
- 2022: ▲5.11 million
- 2023: ▲5.24 million
- 2024: ▲5.48 million
- 2025: ▼5.43 million

Railway companies
- Original company: District Railway; Great Northern, Piccadilly and Brompton Railway

Key dates
- 9 September 1874: DR line opened
- 9 October 1905: DR station opened
- 15 December 1906: GNP&B platforms opened

Listed status
- Listing grade: II
- Entry number: 1358562
- Added to list: 14 February 1985

Other information
- External links: TfL station info page
- Coordinates: 51.49056°N 0.21361°W

Barons Court is a London Underground station in West Kensington in the London Borough of Hammersmith and Fulham. It is served by the District and Piccadilly lines, and is in London fare zone 2. On the District line, the station is between Hammersmith and West Kensington stations. On the Piccadilly line, it is between Hammersmith and Earl's Court stations.

East of the station, the Piccadilly line descends into tunnel towards Earl's Court and the District line continues in a cutting to West Kensington. The station is the last open air stop for eastbound trains on the Piccadilly line until Arnos Grove and has cross-platform interchange with the District line.

== Location ==
The station is located on Gliddon Road, a short distance from Talgarth Road (A4). East of the station, the Piccadilly line descends into tunnel towards Earl's Court and the District line continues on the surface to West Kensington. West of the station, both Piccadilly line and District line continue to Hammersmith station. The station is located in a deep, brick sided cutting.

== History ==
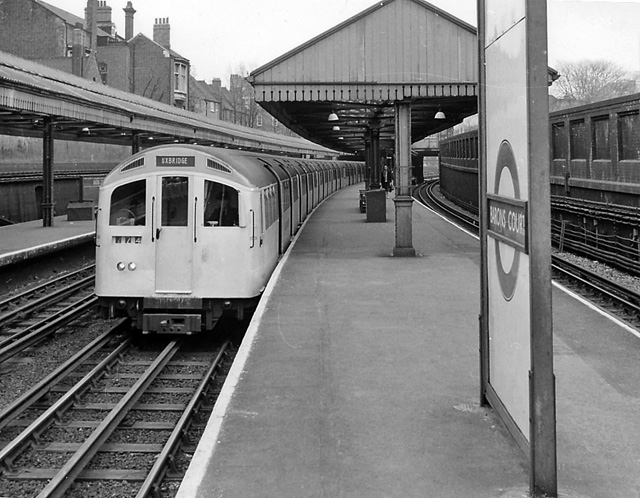
The station in May 1962 looking east with a westbound Piccadilly line train to Uxbridge.

The tracks through Barons Court were first laid on 9 September 1874 when the District Railway (DR, now the District line) opened an extension from Earl's Court to Hammersmith. When the line was constructed the area now known as "Barons Court" was open fields and market gardens to the west of the hamlet of North End and there was no call for a station between North End, Fulham and Hammersmith stations.

However, by the beginning of the 20th century, the area had been developed for housing and, on 9 October 1905, the District Railway (DR) opened a station to serve these new developments and in preparation for the opening of the Great Northern, Piccadilly and Brompton Railway (GNP&BR, now the Piccadilly line), then under construction. The GNP&BR began operations on 15 December 1906, running between Hammersmith and Finsbury Park.

The station was designed as a single story pavilion with an architectural style incorporating both Classical and Art Nouveau features and accommodates both ticket office and retail units. The parade of shops opposite the station were completed in 1926. The former Formula One driver B. Bira, who was a member of the Thai Royal family, was found dead at the station on 23 December 1985. In the 1990s, the Grade II listed station was carefully restored to its original 1906 appearance. There is currently a two year plan of works ongoing to revamp the station, including returning to the original green and cream colour scheme.

== The station today ==
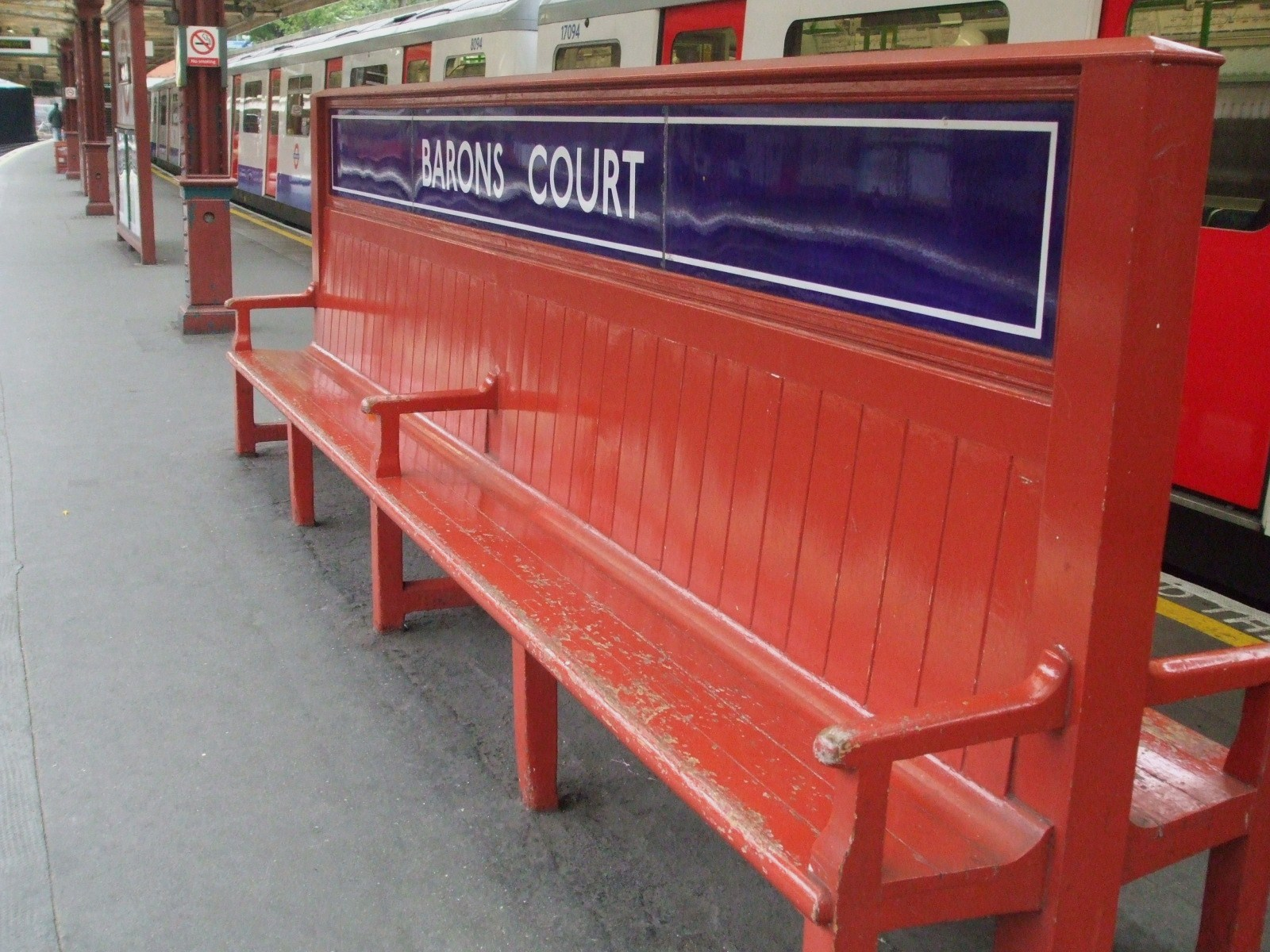
The unique bench on the eastbound island platform.

The station building was constructed to a design by Harry Ford in a style similar to that used at Earl's Court and Hammersmith and is now a Grade II listed building as it retains many of its original features, including terracotta facing and Art Nouveau lettering. The wooden benches on the platform with the station name along the back on enamelled metal panels are a unique feature on the entire London Underground. The station has two island platforms to provide an interchange between the two lines – the inner pair of tracks is used by the Piccadilly line and the outer tracks by the District line.

The station building has been Grade II listed since 14 February 1985. Work began in February 2025 on restoring and repairing the station, including a replacement of worn platform edges and is set to finish in Spring 2027.

== Name ==
The name Barons Court is possibly inspired by the Baronscourt estate in County Tyrone, Northern Ireland, where Sir William Palliser, who built part of the area, may have had connections. Unlike Earl's Court station, Barons Court is written without an apostrophe.

== Services ==
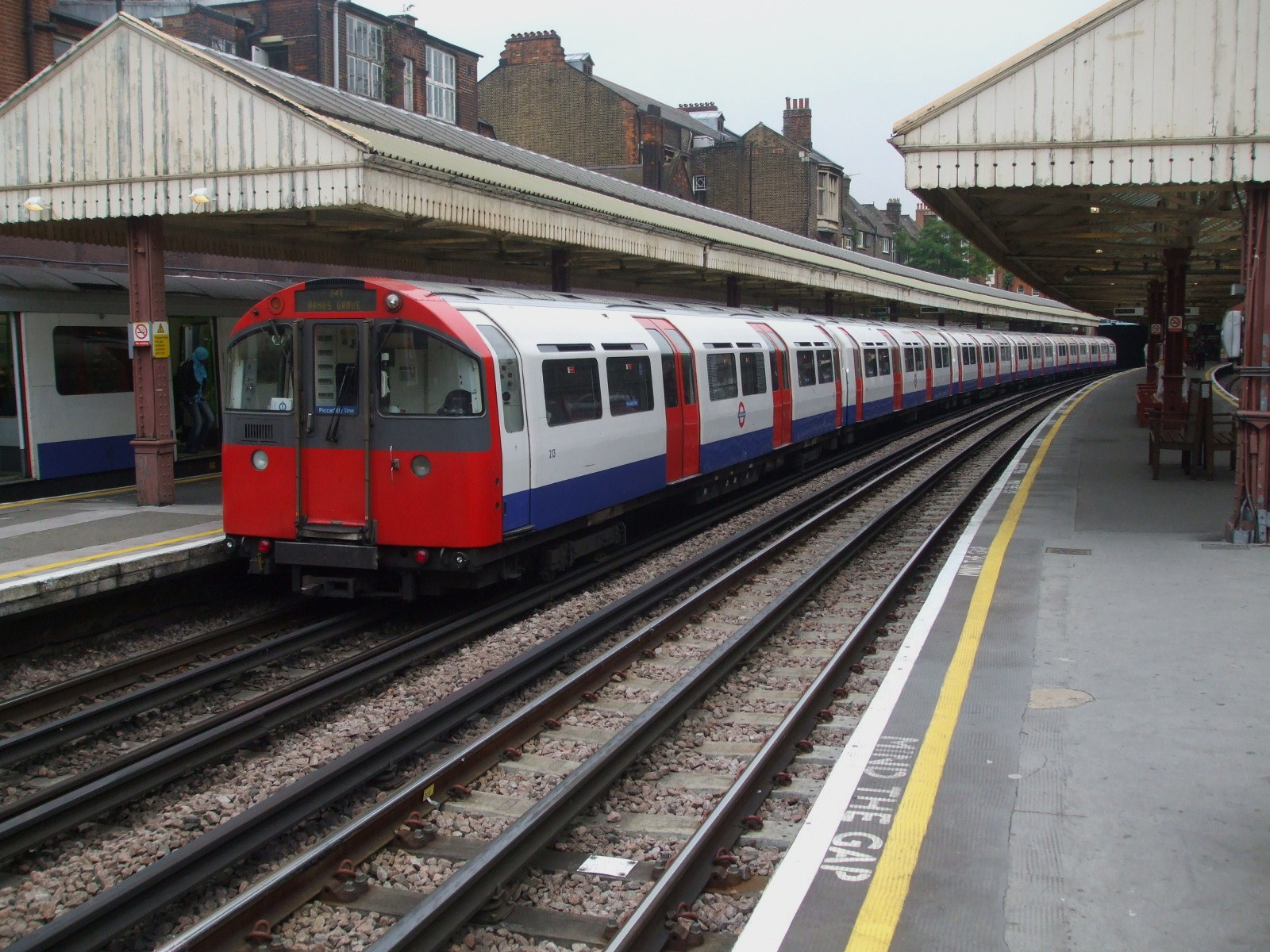
A Piccadilly line train to Arnos Grove standing at eastbound platform 3

Barons Court station is on the District and Piccadilly lines in London fare zone 2.

=== District line ===
On the District line, Barons Court station is between Hammersmith to the west and West Kensington to the east. The typical off-peak service in trains per hour (tph) is:

- 12 tph eastbound to Upminster (6tph to Barking on Sundays)
- 6tph westbound to Ealing Broadway
- 6 tph westbound to Richmond

There is also a morning service every day from Acton Town (Ealing Broadway on Saturdays) to Edgware Road and a late evening service from Edgware Road to Ealing Broadway on Sundays only.

=== Piccadilly line ===
On the Piccadilly line, Barons Court station is between Hammersmith to the west and Earl's Court to the east. The typical off-peak service in trains per hour (tph) is as follows:

- 18 tph eastbound to Cockfosters
- 3 tph eastbound to Arnos Grove
- 6 tph westbound to Heathrow Terminals 2 & 3 and 5
- 6 tph westbound to Heathrow Terminals 4 and 2 & 3
- 3 tph westbound to Northfields
- 3 tph westbound to Rayners Lane
- 3 tph westbound to Uxbridge

Preceding station	London Underground	Following station
Hammersmith towards Ealing Broadway or Richmond	District line	West Kensington towards Upminster, High Street Kensington or Edgware Road
Hammersmith towards Uxbridge, Rayners Lane or Heathrow Airport (Terminal 4 or Terminal 5)	Piccadilly line	Earl's Court towards Cockfosters or Arnos Grove

== Nearby places ==
- Ealing, Hammersmith and West London College's Hammersmith site is across Talgarth Road on Gliddon Road.
- The Queen's Club, location of the Aegon Championships tennis tournament, is at the end of Palliser Road.
- The London Academy of Music and Dramatic Art, (LAMDA), is on the Talgarth Road.
- Margravine Cemetery
- Charing Cross Hospital is nearby, and is advertised at the station exit.
