= North Ealing tube station =

London Underground station

North Ealing
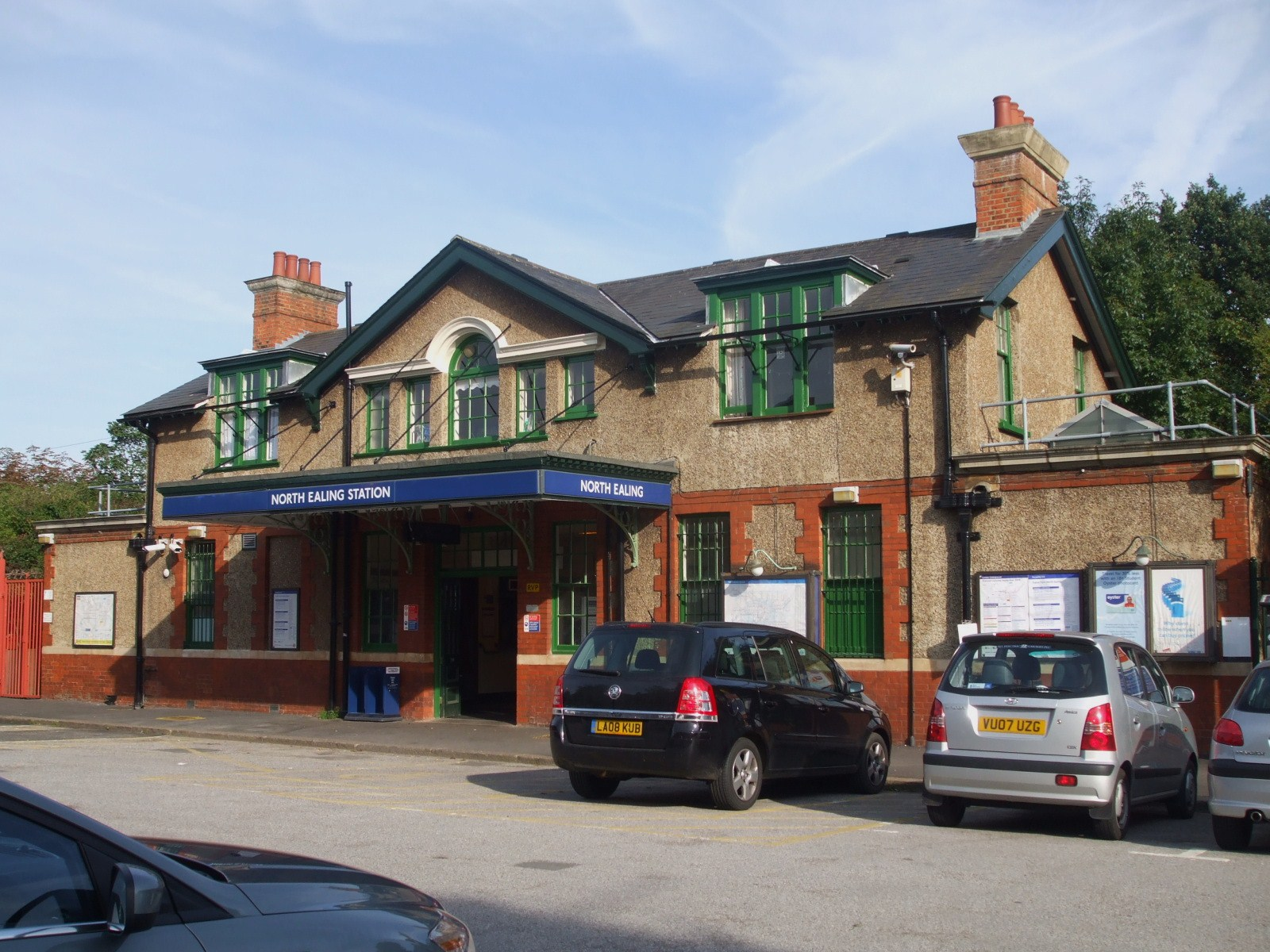
- Station entrance
- Interactive map of North Ealing

General information
- Location: Ealing
- Local authority: London Borough of Ealing
- Managed by: London Underground
- Number of platforms: 2
- Fare zone: 3

London Underground annual entry and exit
- 2020: ▼0.51 million
- 2021: ▼0.36 million
- 2022: ▲0.59 million
- 2023: ▲0.61 million
- 2024: ▲0.62 million

Railway companies
- Original company: District Railway

Key dates
- 23 June 1903: Station opened
- 4 July 1932: District line service replaced by Piccadilly line

Listed status
- Listing grade: II
- Entry number: 1390751
- Added to list: 30 October 2003; 22 years ago

Other information
- External links: TfL station info page
- Coordinates: 51.51750°N 0.28861°W

North Ealing is a London Underground station in west London. It is on the Uxbridge branch of the Piccadilly line, between Park Royal and Ealing Common stations. The station is located on Station Road, a short distance from the junction of Queen's Drive and Hanger Lane (A406, North Circular Road). It is in London fare zone 3. West Acton tube station on the Central line is situated 550 metres to the east at the other end of Queen's Drive.

Despite its name, the station is geographically located to the east of Ealing Broadway; the areas of Gurnell, Pitshanger, Montpelier and Hanger Hill/Hanger Lane are more geographically suited to the term "North Ealing". There is even a primary school named North Ealing within Pitshanger.

== History ==
North Ealing station was opened on 23 June 1903 by the District Railway (DR, now the District line) on its new extension from north of Ealing Common to Park Royal & Twyford Abbey (closed and replaced by Park Royal in 1931), where the Royal Agricultural Society's Park Royal show grounds had been recently opened. The line was opened fully to South Harrow on 28 June 1903.

This new extension was, together with the existing tracks between Ealing Common and Acton Town, the first section of the Underground's surface lines to be electrified and operate electric instead of steam trains. The deep-level tube lines open at that time (City & South London Railway, Waterloo & City Railway and Central London Railway) had been electrically powered from the start.

North Ealing was the only station on the South Harrow branch not rebuilt in the 1930s to the "Holden" style for the start of the Piccadilly Line service. As a result, it retains its slightly rural air. A 1930s railway sub-station is built alongside the Eastbound platform and is typical of the LPTB brick and concrete architectural style of the period.

On 4 July 1932 the Piccadilly line was extended to run west of its original terminus at Hammersmith sharing the route with the District line to Ealing Common. From Ealing Common to South Harrow, the District line was replaced by the Piccadilly line and, from this date, District line trains west from Ealing Common ran to Ealing Broadway only.

In 2018, it was announced that the station would gain step free access by 2022, as part of a £200M investment to increase the number of accessible stations on the Tube.

== Services ==
North Ealing station is on the Uxbridge branch of the Piccadilly line in London fare zone 3. It is between Park Royal to the west and Ealing Common to the east.

The peak time service in trains per hour (tph) is:

- 12 tph to Cockfosters (Eastbound)
- 6 tph to Rayners Lane (Westbound)
- 6 tph to Uxbridge via Rayners Lane (Westbound)

The off-peak service in trains per hour (tph) is:

- 6 tph to Cockfosters (Eastbound)
- 3 tph to Rayners Lane (Westbound)
- 3 tph to Uxbridge via Rayners Lane (Westbound)

Preceding station	London Underground	Following station
Park Royal towards Uxbridge or Rayners Lane	Piccadilly line Uxbridge branch	Ealing Common towards Cockfosters or Arnos Grove
Former services
Preceding station	London Underground	Following station
Park Royal & Twyford Abbey towards South Harrow or Uxbridge	District line (1903–1931)	Ealing Common towards Upminster
Park Royal towards South Harrow or Uxbridge	District line (1931–1932)	Ealing Common towards Upminster

== Connections ==
Various day and nighttime London Buses routesserve the station.
