= Ealing Common tube station =

London Underground station

Ealing Common
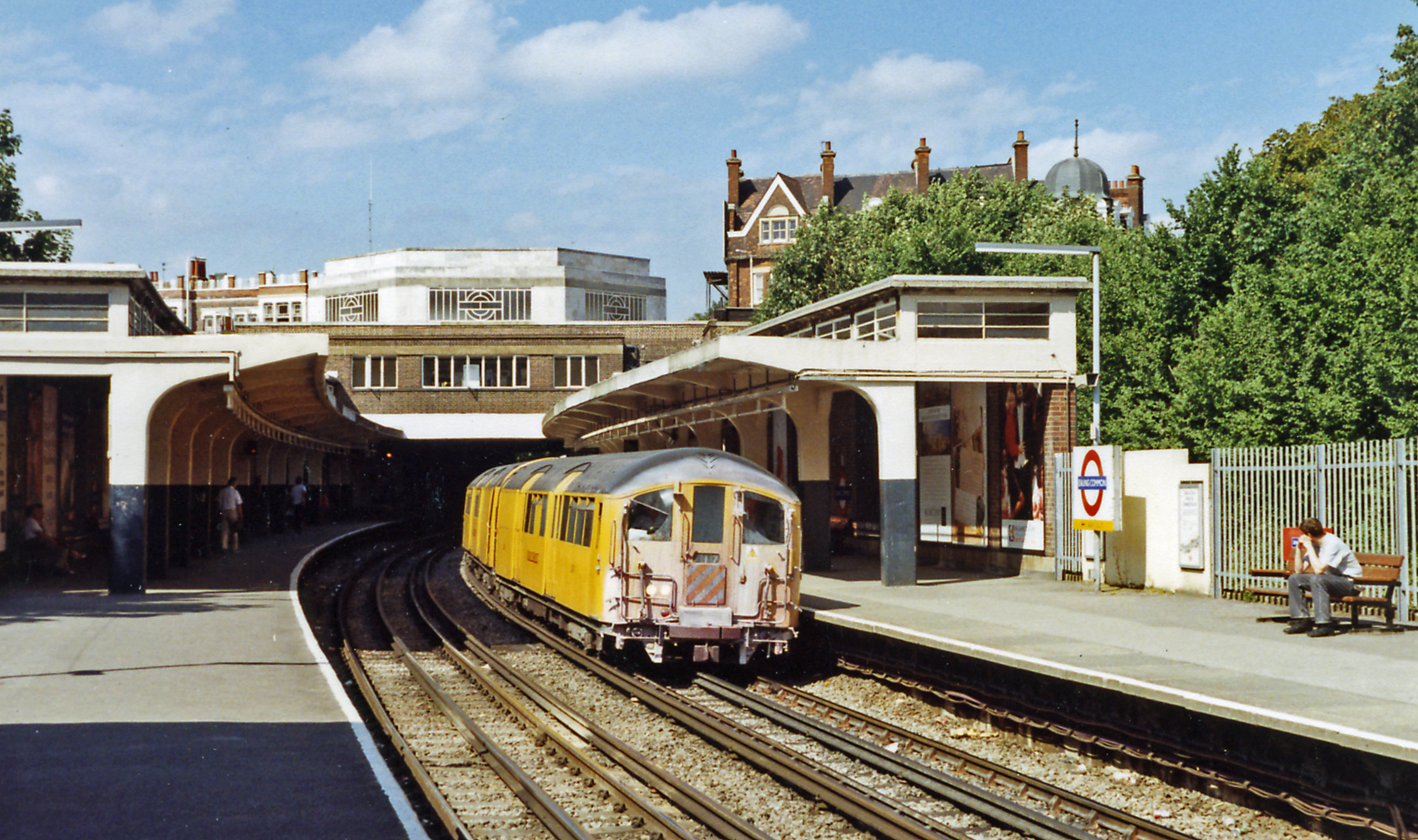
- Ealing Common station in 1991
- Interactive map of Ealing Common

General information
- Location: Ealing
- Local authority: London Borough of Ealing
- Managed by: London Underground
- Number of platforms: 2
- Fare zone: 3

London Underground annual entry and exit
- 2020: ▼1.61 million
- 2021: ▼1.31 million
- 2022: ▲2.02 million
- 2023: ▼1.95 million
- 2024: ▼1.93 million

Railway companies
- Original company: District Railway

Key dates
- 1 July 1879: Opened as Ealing Common
- 1886: Renamed Ealing Common and West Acton
- 23 June 1903: Line to Park Royal & Twyford Abbey opened
- 1 March 1910: Renamed Ealing Common
- 4 July 1932: Piccadilly line service introduced

Listed status
- Listing grade: II
- Entry number: 1249986
- Added to list: 17 May 1994

Other information
- External links: TfL station info page
- Coordinates: 51.51028°N 0.28806°W

Ealing Common is a London Underground station, located in the London Borough of Ealing. It is served by the District and Piccadilly lines, and is in London fare zone 3. On the Ealing Broadway branch of the District line, the station is between Ealing Broadway and Acton Town stations. On the Uxbridge branch of the Piccadilly line, it is between North Ealing and Acton Town stations. It is the only station west of Acton Town to be served by both the District and Piccadilly lines.

The station is situated in Ealing on the Uxbridge Road (A4020), about 490 yards (450 m) east of the junction with Gunnersbury Avenue and Hanger Lane (A406, North Circular Road) and the Ealing Common open space the station takes its name from.

== History ==
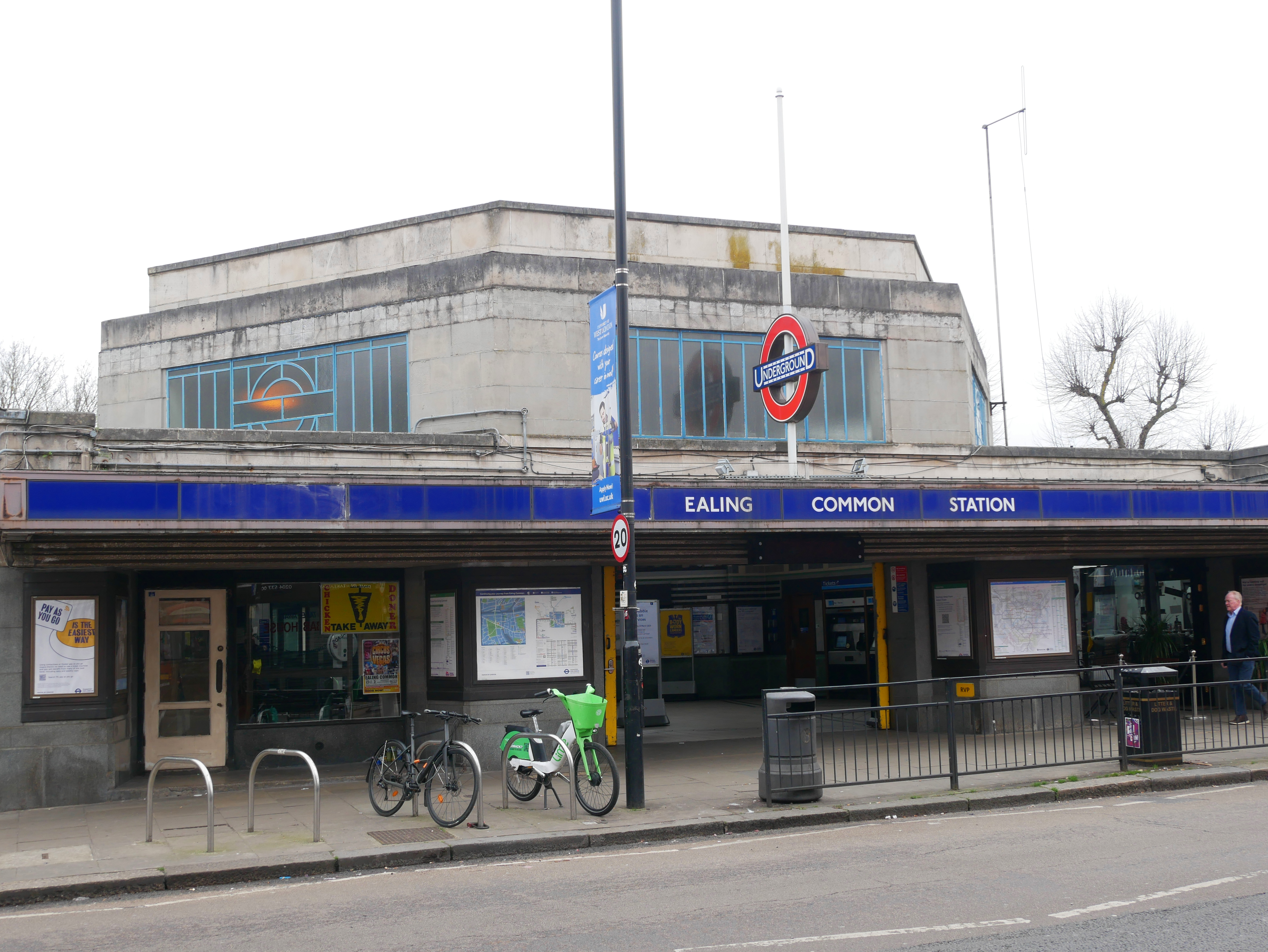
The north face of Ealing Common station

Ealing Common station was opened on 1 July 1879 by the District Railway (DR, now the District line) on its extension from Turnham Green to Ealing Broadway. From 1886 until 1 March 1910 the station was known as Ealing Common and West Acton after which it changed to its current name.

On 23 June 1903, the DR opened an extension of the tracks from north of Ealing Common. The extension initially reached as far as Park Royal & Twyford Abbey (closed and replaced by Park Royal in 1931), where the Royal Agricultural Society's Park Royal show grounds had been recently opened, before being opened to South Harrow on 28 June 1903.

This new extension was, together with the existing tracks between Ealing Common and Acton Town, the first section of the Underground's surface lines to be electrified and operate electric instead of steam trains. The deep level tube lines open at that time (City and South London Railway, Waterloo and City Railway, and Central London Railway) had been electrically powered from the start. Electric trains started running on the section of line between Ealing Common and Ealing Broadway on 1 July 1905.

During 1930 and 1931, a new station building was constructed to replace the 1879 building. The new building, by Charles Holden in a style reminiscent of his designs for the 1926 Morden extension of the City and South London Railway (now part of the Northern line), was constructed in Portland stone and features a tall heptagonal ticket hall with glazed screens to all sides. The new building opened on 1 March 1931 and is very similar to the reconstructed station at Hounslow West built at the same time, also by Heaps and Holden.

On 4 July 1932, the Piccadilly line was extended to run west of its original terminus at Hammersmith, sharing the route with the District line to Ealing Common. From Ealing Common to South Harrow, the District line was replaced by the Piccadilly line and, from this date, District line trains west from Ealing Common run to Ealing Broadway only.

== The station today ==
There is a shop/kiosk available at times in the station booking hall area. Many trains leaving Ealing Common Depot enter service here. This is usually in the early morning, and in the westbound direction (towards Ealing Broadway Station).

Although it is possible for trains to enter the depot directly from platform one (the westbound platform), this rarely happens except for a few empty trains after the station is closed at night. However, at times of disruption it is possible for trains to arrive on platform one and, empty of passengers, then it would have to shunt forward in order to reverse and enter the depot. The train would then stable, or reverse into platform two in order to re-enter service and continue eastbound.

To the east of platform two, there are two siding roads. Those stop approximately halfway along the adjacent main-line road. They are separated from the platforms by a cement wall (behind which viewing is possible) and a wooden locked door from the platform. These roads are not connected directly to the main line, but to Ealing Common Depot and are used for shunting and reversing trains within the depot.

== Services ==
Ealing Common station is on the District and Piccadilly lines in London fare zone 3.

=== District line ===
On the Ealing Broadway branch of the District line, Ealing Common station is between Ealing Broadway to the west and Acton Town to the east.

The peak time service in trains per hour (tph) is:

- 8 tph to Upminster (Eastbound)
- 8 tph to Ealing Broadway (Westbound)

The off-peak service is:

- 6 tph to Upminster (Eastbound)
- 6 tph to Ealing Broadway (Westbound)

=== Piccadilly line ===
On the Uxbridge branch of the Piccadilly line, Ealing Common station is between North Ealing to the west and Acton Town to the east.

The peak time service is:

- 12 tph to Cockfosters (Eastbound)
- 6 tph to Rayners Lane (Westbound)
- 6 tph to Uxbridge via Rayners Lane (Westbound)

The off-peak service is:

- 6 tph to Cockfosters (Eastbound)
- 3 tph to Rayners Lane (Westbound)
- 3 tph to Uxbridge via Rayners Lane (Westbound)

| Preceding station | London Underground | Following station |
|---|---|---|
| Ealing Broadway Terminus | District line Ealing Broadway branch | Acton Town towards Upminster, High Street Kensington or Edgware Road |
| North Ealing towards Uxbridge or Rayners Lane | Piccadilly line Uxbridge branch | Acton Town towards Cockfosters or Arnos Grove |
Former services
| Preceding station | London Underground | Following station |
| North Ealing towards South Harrow or Uxbridge | District line (1903–1932) | Acton Town towards Upminster |

== Connections ==
Various day and nighttime London Buses routes serve the station.
