= South Harrow tube station =

London Underground station

South Harrow
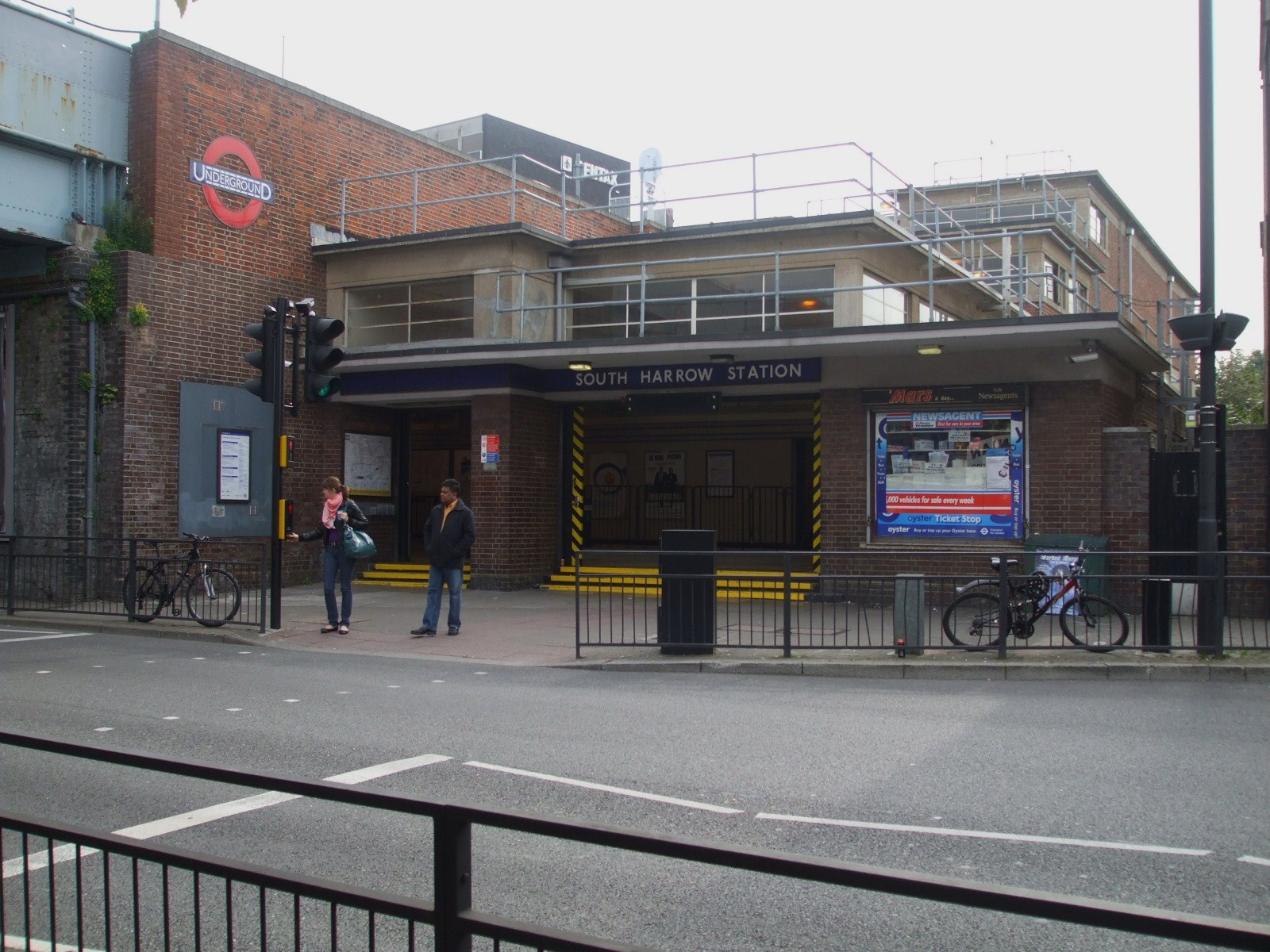
- Southern entrance
- Interactive map of South Harrow

General information
- Location: South Harrow
- Local authority: London Borough of Harrow
- Managed by: London Underground
- Number of platforms: 2
- Fare zone: 5

London Underground annual entry and exit
- 2020: ▼1.58 million
- 2021: ▼1.01 million
- 2022: ▲1.67 million
- 2023: ▲2.04 million
- 2024: ▲2.08 million

Key dates
- 28 June 1903: Opened as terminus (DR)
- 1 March 1910: Becomes through station
- 4 July 1932: Start (Piccadilly line, terminus)
- 23 October 1933: End (District line, eastbound)
- 23 October 1933: Start (Piccadilly line to Uxbridge)
- 5 July 1935: Station rebuilt
- 1954: Goods yard closed

Other information
- External links: TfL station info page
- Coordinates: 51.56472°N 0.35222°W

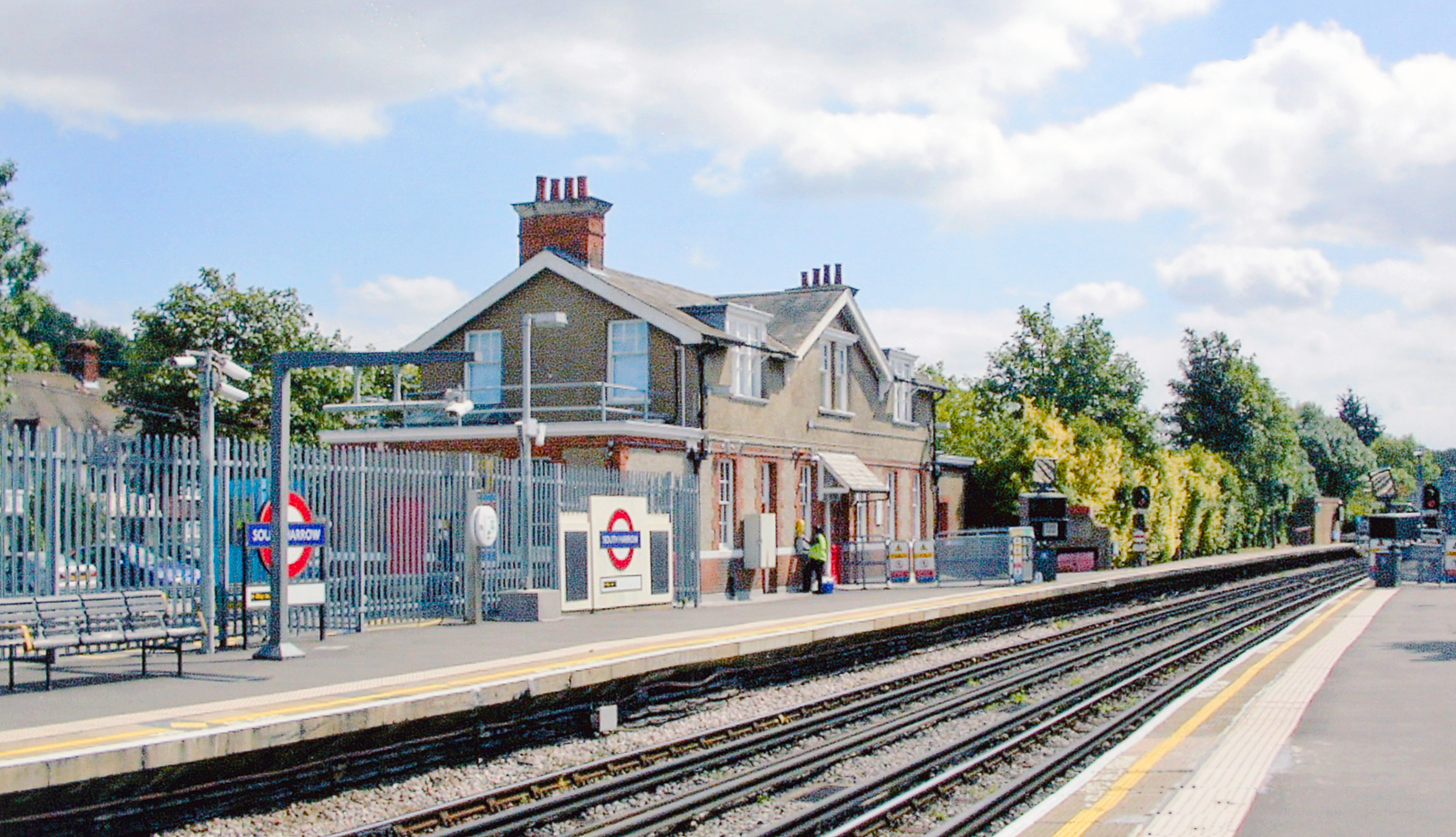
Platform view

South Harrow is a London Underground station in South Harrow, north-west London. It is on the Uxbridge branch of the Piccadilly line, between Rayners Lane and Sudbury Hill stations. The station is located on Northolt Road (A312). It is in London fare zone 5.

There are several bus stands outside the station as well as overnight train stabling sidings.

== History ==
South Harrow station was opened on 28 June 1903 by the District Railway (DR, now the District line) as the terminus of its new extension from Park Royal & Twyford Abbey.

This new extension was, together with the existing tracks back to Acton Town, the first section of the Underground's surface lines to be electrified and operate electric instead of steam trains. The Deep level tube lines open at that time (City & South London Railway, Waterloo & City Railway and Central London Railway) had been electrically powered from the start.

On 1 March 1910, the DR was extended north to meet the Metropolitan Railway (MR, now the Metropolitan line) tracks at Rayners Lane and services commenced over the MR's tracks to Uxbridge. North of the station the line crosses the Roxeth Marsh; the viaduct over it between South Harrow and Rayners Lane was an engineering feat of the time.

On 4 July 1932, the Piccadilly line was extended to run west of its original terminus at Hammersmith sharing the route with the District line to Ealing Common. From Ealing Common to South Harrow, the District line was replaced by the Piccadilly line. From South Harrow north, an isolated District line service continued to operate to Uxbridge until 22 October 1933 when the Piccadilly line took over the service to Uxbridge.

The original station building is located approximately 170m south of the existing station and can be accessed from South Hill Avenue. It is similar to the building still in use at North Ealing and remains, adjacent to the eastbound platform, in the car park on the north side of the tracks. Today it is used by London Underground as office space for drivers before and after stabling trains in the sidings and driver shift changes. On 5 July 1935, a new station was opened accessed from Northolt Road. The new station building was designed by Charles Holden as a graduated structure stepping up on each side to the platforms of the high level tracks. The brick walls and bands of horizontal glazing are capped with a series of flat concrete slab roofs.

== Stabling Sidings ==
The 5 west facing dead ended sidings are located to the east of South Harrow and are accessed from both platforms via a pair of crossovers. They are mainly used to stable stock at the close of service as well as engineering trains subject to requirement.

Until the summer of 2015, nine cars of ex-Jubilee Line 1983 Stock were stored there following withdrawal in 1998 in preparation for the Jubilee Line Extension (JLE) and the introduction of the 1996 Stock. The units, which had been out of service for seventeen years, were in a heavily vandalised condition, having spent longer in storage than their fourteen years in operational service on the Jubilee line. All nine carriages were removed for scrapping on the weekend of 27/28 June 2015, which involved being craned onto low loaders during a weekend closure. The stabling capacity was required to facilitate the introduction of the Night Tube on certain parts of the Piccadilly line.

Also stabled in the sidings between 1999 and 2004 was a 1972 (Mark I) tube stock train. This train was unit 3227 and was painted in an experimental livery of blue doors and red cab ends. Like the 1983 tube stocks, it suffered vandalism. This unit was withdrawn from the Northern line after failing at Edgware and it was removed in 2004 and sent to MOD Shoeburyness for storage and scrapping. Another 1972 Mark I unit (3205) in the original condition was stored at the sidings, but this has also been scrapped. A third unit of 1972 stock was stored but that one was immediately stored at the disused Aldwych branch for filming purposes.

== Services ==
South Harrow station is on the Uxbridge branch of the Piccadilly line in London fare zone 5. It is between Rayners Lane to the west and Sudbury Hill to the east.

The typical off-peak service in trains per hour (tph) is:

- 6 tph to Cockfosters (Eastbound)
- 3 tph to Rayners Lane (Westbound)
- 3 tph to Uxbridge via Rayners Lane (Westbound)

The peak time service in trains per hour (tph) is:

- 12 tph to Cockfosters (Eastbound)
- 6 tph to Rayners Lane (Westbound)
- 6 tph to Uxbridge via Rayners Lane (Westbound)

Preceding station	London Underground	Following station
Rayners Lane towards Uxbridge	Piccadilly line Uxbridge branch	Sudbury Hill towards Cockfosters or Arnos Grove
Rayners Lane Terminus	Piccadilly line Uxbridge branch	Sudbury Hill towards Cockfosters or Arnos Grove
Preceding station	London Underground	Following station
Former services
Terminus	District line (1903-1910)	Sudbury Hill towards Upminster
Rayners Lane towards Uxbridge	District line (1910-1932)	Sudbury Hill towards Upminster
Rayners Lane towards Uxbridge	District line (1932-1933)	Terminus
Terminus	Piccadilly line (1932-1933)	Sudbury Hill towards Arnos Grove or Oakwood

== Connections ==
Various London Buses routes serve the station.
