= Park Royal & Twyford Abbey tube station =

Closed London Underground station

Park Royal & Twyford Abbey
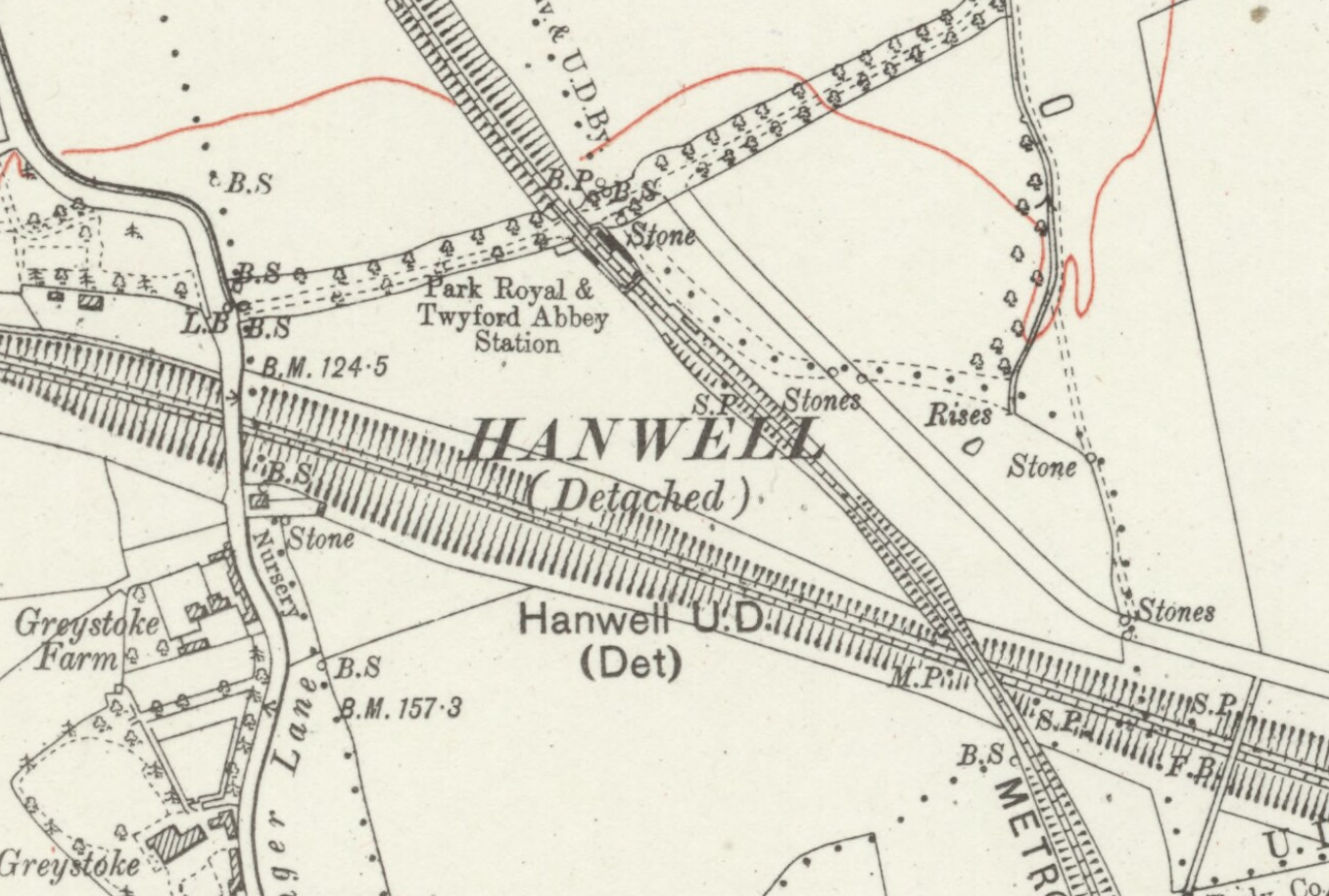
- The station on a 1920 map
- Interactive map of Park Royal & Twyford Abbey

General information
- Location: Park Royal
- Owner: District Railway
- Number of platforms: 2

Key dates
- 23 June 1903: Opened
- 5 July 1931: Closed
- Replaced by: Park Royal

Other information
- Coordinates: 51°31′53″N 0°17′22″W

Park Royal & Twyford Abbey was a London Underground station on the District Railway (now the District line), on a route now utilised by the Uxbridge branch of the Piccadilly line. It opened in 1903.

It was located near Twyford Abbey Road, a short distance north of the current Park Royal station which replaced it in 1931.

== History ==
The station was opened on 23 June 1903 by the District Railway on a new branch line to South Harrow and Metropolitan line tracks at Rayners Lane.

Park Royal & Twyford Abbey was intended to serve the recently opened Royal Agricultural Society showgrounds at Park Royal; however, despite the proximity of the station (and another to the east on what is now the Central line), the showgrounds were not successful and closed after only a few years. The second part of the station's name was adopted from the nearby Twyford Abbey.

The station closed permanently on 5 July 1931 to be replaced the following day by a new Park Royal station built for the extension of Piccadilly line services to South Harrow. The new station is located approximately one-third of a mile to the south to provide access from the A40 (Western Avenue), constructed in the 1920s. Nothing of the Park Royal & Twyford Abbey station remains.

Unusually, whilst the site of station is on the route of the modern Piccadilly line, it was never served by Piccadilly line trains, as they did not begin to operate to South Harrow until July 1932, a year after the station closed.

== Bibliography ==
- Rose, Douglas (1999) [1980]. The London Underground, A Diagrammatic History (7th ed.). Douglas Rose/Capital Transport. ISBN 1-85414-219-4.

Former services
| Preceding station | London Underground | Following station |
|---|---|---|
| Alperton towards South Harrow or Uxbridge | District line (1903-1931) | North Ealing towards Upminster |
