= Arnos Grove tube station =

London Underground station

Arnos Grove
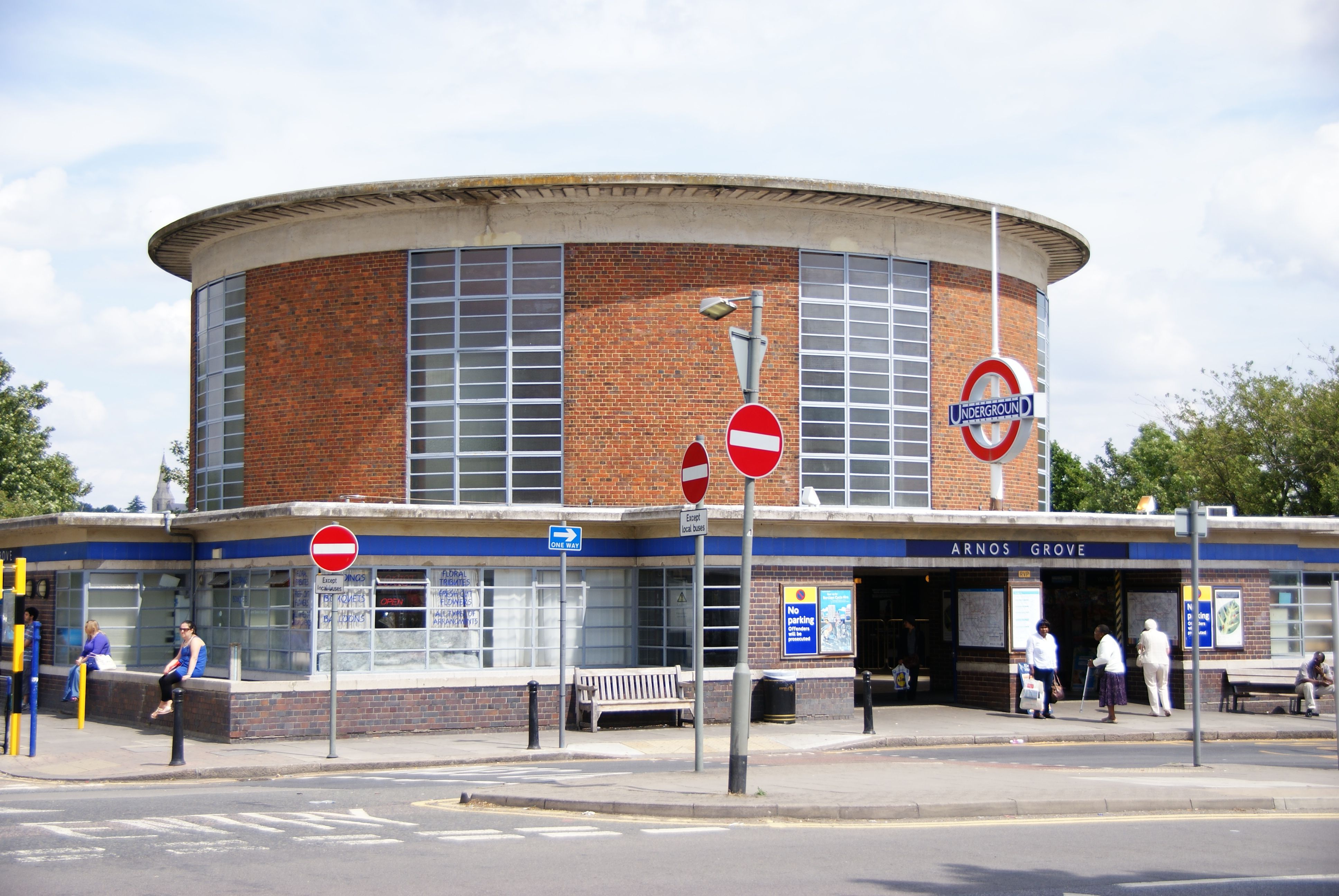
- Arnos Grove station
- Interactive map of Arnos Grove

General information
- Location: Arnos Grove
- Local authority: London Borough of Enfield
- Managed by: London Underground
- Number of platforms: 4
- Tracks: 3
- Fare zone: 4

London Underground annual entry and exit
- 2020: ▼2.34 million
- 2021: ▼1.96 million
- 2022: ▲3.30 million
- 2023: ▼3.29 million
- 2024: ▼3.15 million

Railway companies
- Original company: London Electric Railway

Key dates
- 19 September 1932: Station opened as terminus
- 13 March 1933: Line extended to Enfield West (now Oakwood)

Listed status
- Listing grade: II* (since 20 July 2011)
- Entry number: 1358981
- Added to list: 19 February 1971; 55 years ago

Other information
- External links: TfL station info page
- Coordinates: 51.6163°N 0.1335°W

Arnos Grove (/ˈɑːrnɒs ˈɡroʊv/) is a London Underground station. It is located in Arnos Grove in the London Borough of Enfield, north London. The station is on the Piccadilly line, between Bounds Green and Southgate stations. It is in London fare zone 4.

The station opened on 19 September 1932 as the most northerly station on the first section of the Piccadilly line extension from Finsbury Park to Cockfosters. It was the terminus of the line until services were further extended to Oakwood on 13 March 1933. When travelling from east of Barons Court and through Central London, Arnos Grove is the first surface station after the long tunnel section of the Piccadilly line. The station has four platforms which face three tracks.

The station was designed by architect Charles Holden, and has been described as a significant work of modern architecture. On 19 February 1971, the station was Grade II listed. In 2005, the station was refurbished with the heritage features also maintained. In July 2011 Arnos Grove's listed status was upgraded to Grade II*. The station was awarded with the Best Newcomer and the Best Overall Garden in the Underground in Bloom 2011 competition and also in the London in Bloom competition.

== Location ==
The station is located on A1110 Bowes Road, serving a medium-sized residential area. Arnos Grove is the first surface station after the long tunnel section which starts east of Barons Court and passes through Central London. The station and surrounding neighbourhood of Arnos Grove take their names from the Arnos Grove estate, which was to the north of the station. The station is part of the Arnos Grove group of stations, comprising all seven stations from Cockfosters to Turnpike Lane, and the management office for the group is in Arnos Grove station. Linked to the station by a lineside passageway is Ash House, which is a drivers' depot. Nearby attractions include Arnos Park, Broomfield School and Bowes Road Library. Arnos Grove is known for its circular ticket hall and as a quiet, peaceful and green neighbourhood until the 1960s. When the Piccadilly line extension came, Edwardian villas were built in the area.

== History ==
The Great Northern Railway (GNR) and its successor, the London and North Eastern Railway (LNER), for many years refused consent for any extension into the suburbs of Haringey and Enfield. In 1902, parliamentary approval was obtained to ban any further extensions of London Underground lines northwards from Finsbury Park. This created a bottleneck at Finsbury Park, back then the northern terminus of the Piccadilly line. (Note: Passengers heading to places north of Finsbury Park such as Arnos Grove had to change to buses, trams or change onto Great Northern trains.) By 1923, a public campaign against the 1902 parliamentary ban emerged, and Frank Pick had risen to assistant managing director of the Underground group. To help address this issue, Frank Pick gathered photographs of the congestion at Finsbury Park and distributed to the press. In 1925, the LNER gave in to the objection. Pick began working on the extension proposal and obtained parliamentary approval in 1929. The alignment was based on the absence of property development along the line. Funding was obtained from legislation under the Development (Loan Guarantees and Grants) Act 1929 instead of the Trade Facilities Act. Tunnel rings, cabling and concrete were produced in Northern England, while unemployed industrial workers there helped in the construction of the extension. 22 tunnelling shields were used during construction which started in 1930. The station was opened on 19 September 1932 as the terminus on the first section of the Piccadilly line extension to Cockfosters. The line was further extended to Oakwood on 13 March 1933. Its name was chosen after public deliberation: alternatives were "Arnos Park", "Bowes Road" and "Southgate".

=== Incidents ===
On the night of 13 October 1940, during the Blitz, a lone German aircraft dropped a single bomb on houses to the north of Bounds Green station. The destruction of the houses caused the north end of the westbound platform tunnel to collapse. As a result, train services between Wood Green and Cockfosters were disrupted for two months.

On 11 August 1948, a passenger train was derailed when the front and rear bogies of a carriage took different routes at a set of points at the station.

== Station building ==
Like the other stations Charles Holden designed for the extension, Arnos Grove was built in a modern European style using brick, glass and reinforced concrete and basic geometric shapes. A circular drum-like ticket hall of brick and glass panels rises from a low single-storey structure and is capped by a flat concrete slab roof. The design was said to be inspired by the Stockholm City Library and Swedish architect Gunnar Asplund, (Note: A similar design was employed by Holden for the rebuilding of Chiswick Park on the District line (also in 1932), although the drum there is supplemented with an adjacent brick tower.), although Charles Hutton, Holden's chief assistant stated Holden based the idea on a groundsman's lodge at Midhurst Sanatorium designed by Adams, Holden, and Pearson in 1904–1906. The centre of the ticket hall is occupied by a disused ticket office (a passimeter in London Underground parlance) which houses an exhibition on the station and the line. The original design by Holden was detailed by Charles Hutton, who also had to amend the construction method from Sudbury Town tube station due to issues with leaking shuttering for the concrete roof discolouring the brickwork.

== The station today ==
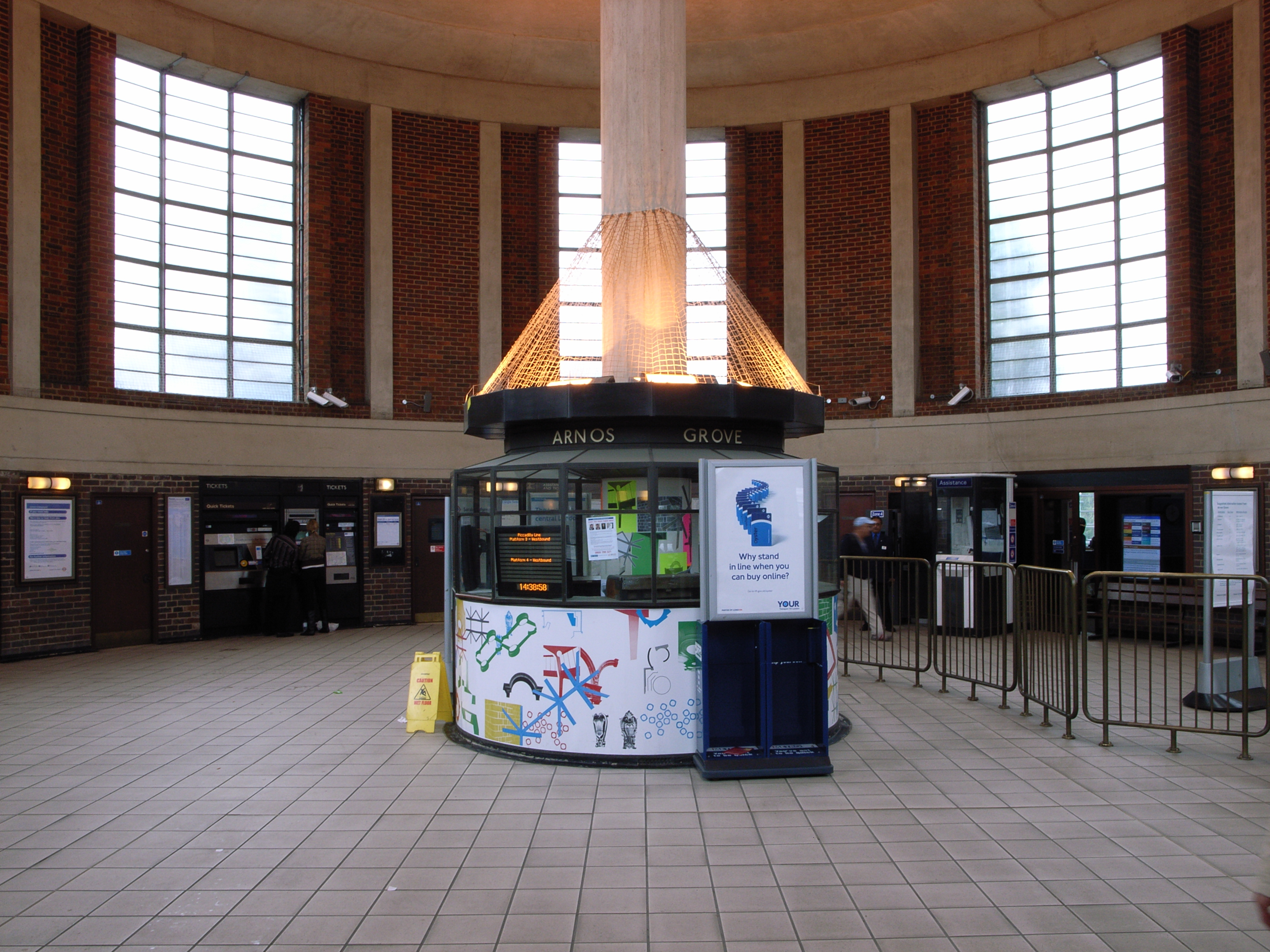
Station interior, showing the circular drum-like ticket hall

Three parallel train tracks pass through the station, with two double-sided platforms between the central track and the outer tracks. The edges of the platforms are labelled platform 1 and 2, and platform 3 and 4, in such a way that the two outer tracks are accessible from platforms 1 and 4, and the central track, usually used by trains that terminate and reverse at Arnos Grove station, is accessible from platforms 2 and 3. Platforms 1 and 2 are designated for trains to Cockfosters while platforms 3 and 4 are for trains to Central London.

When operating a shuttle service between Arnos Grove and Cockfosters, the central track is used exclusively as it has access to both running tracks to/from Southgate (the outer tracks do not have this access).

In July 2011 Arnos Grove became a Grade II* listed building. The building is one of the 12 "Great Modern Buildings" profiled in The Guardian during October 2007. (Note: It was summarised by architectural critic Jonathan Glancey as "...truly what German art historians would describe as a gesamtkunstwerk, a total and entire work of art.") Arnos Grove Drivers' Depot won Best Newcomer and Best Overall Garden in the Underground in Bloom 2011 competition for their new project which also got them an award in the London in Bloom competition. Their website tells the whole story with photographs of the garden and the awards ceremonies.

=== Station improvements ===
In 2005 the station underwent a refurbishment programme including improvements to signage, security and train information systems. General repairs and redecoration were carried out, flooring was renewed, and better lighting, an improved CCTV security system and Help Points were installed, with the latter being suitable for people with limited hearing. Some of the original signs are in a 'petit-serif' adaptation of the London Underground typeface, Johnston Delf Smith Sans. This typeface was designed by Charles Holden and Percy Delf Smith, a former pupil of Edward Johnston.

During the refurbishment programme, all these heritage features were maintained as well:

- The circular 'Sudbury box' red brick building with overhanging crenellated concrete roof and vestibule to front and left-hand elevations
- Dark red brick walls extending to either side of building and also on bridge parapet wall and also on the other side of Bowes Road
- Bronze-framed silhouette roundels with reinstated 1930s graphics on concrete backing panels on brick walls at either end of bus slip road
- Flag pole mounted silhouette roundel with reinstated 1930s graphics on vestibule roof
- Full height windows

== Services and connections ==
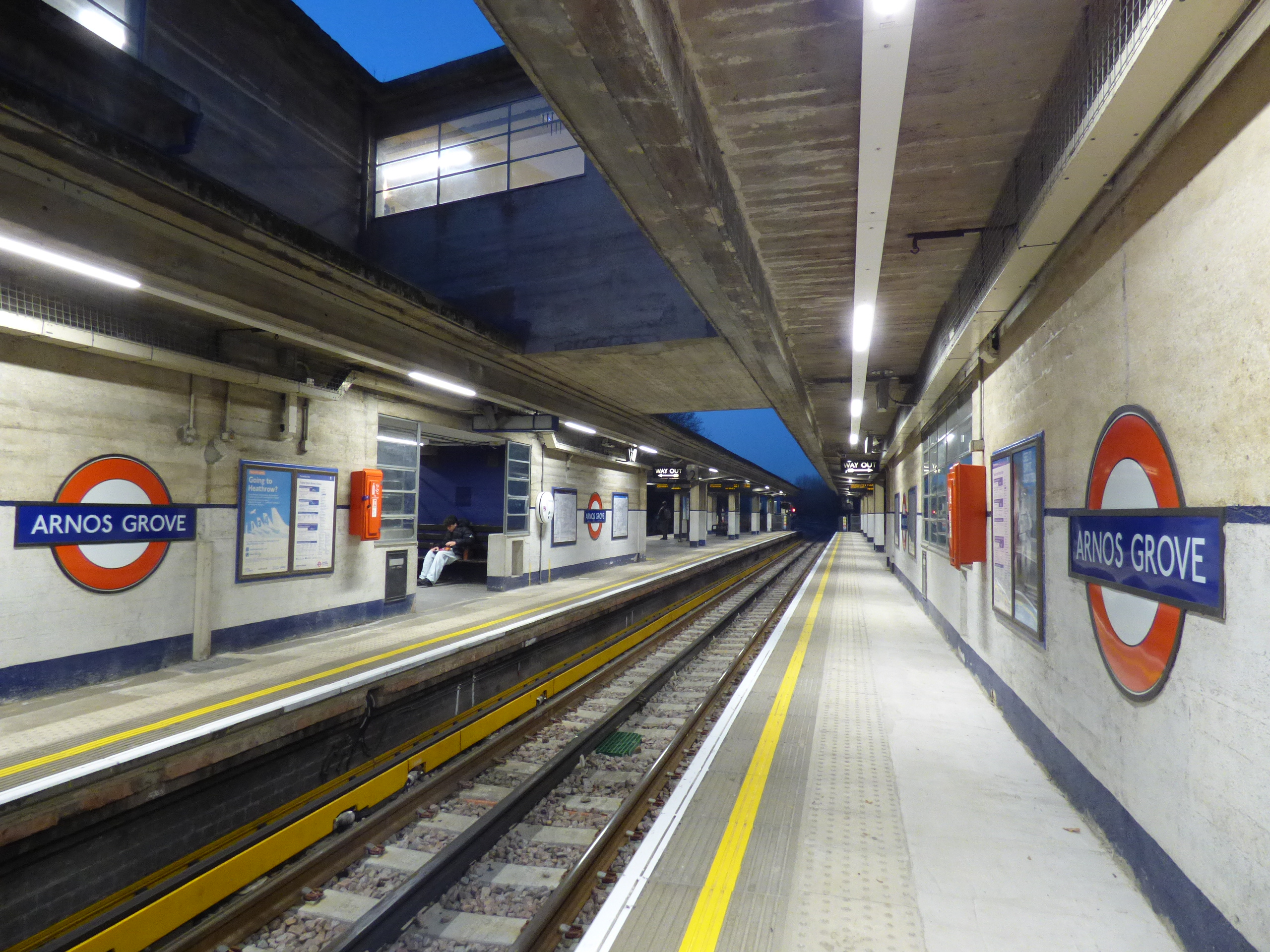
The central Piccadilly line platforms at the station

=== Services ===
Arnos Grove station is on the Piccadilly line in London fare zone 4. It is between Bounds Green to the west and Southgate to the east. A Piccadilly line journey between Arnos Grove and Southgate typically takes slightly more than four minutes.

Train frequencies vary throughout the day, but generally operate every 3–9 minutes between 07:07 and 01:07 eastbound, and every 2–6 minutes between 05:19 and 00:06 westbound. When operational problems occur on the line, Arnos Grove station may act as a temporary terminus of a reduced service – either a shuttle service between Arnos Grove and Cockfosters or a truncated service from Central London. The station has a set of seven sidings to its south for stabling trains.

Preceding station	London Underground	Following station
Bounds Green towards Uxbridge, Rayners Lane or Heathrow Airport (Terminal 4 or Terminal 5)	Piccadilly line Through services	Southgate towards Cockfosters
Bounds Green towards Uxbridge, Rayners Lane or Heathrow Airport (Terminal 4 or Terminal 5)	Piccadilly line Terminating services	Terminus

=== Connections ===
A number of day and nighttime London Buses routes serve the station. New Southgate railway station is a ten-minute walk from Arnos Grove.

== Nearby places ==
- Bounds Green
- Muswell Hill
- New Southgate
- Palmers Green
- Southgate

== In popular culture ==
- The station building appears as "Marble Hill" tube station in the episode "Wasps' Nest" of the Agatha Christie's Poirot TV series with David Suchet as Hercule Poirot.
- Arnos Grove is noted for its station cat (a rarity on the London Underground network), called Spooky, who occupies the station car park after being evicted in 2014 due to the introduction of UTS gates.

== Notes and references ==
=== Bibliography ===
- Martin, Andrew (2012). Underground, Overground: A Passenger's History of the Tube. Profile Books. ISBN 978-1-84765-807-4.
