= Uxbridge tube station =

London Underground station

Uxbridge
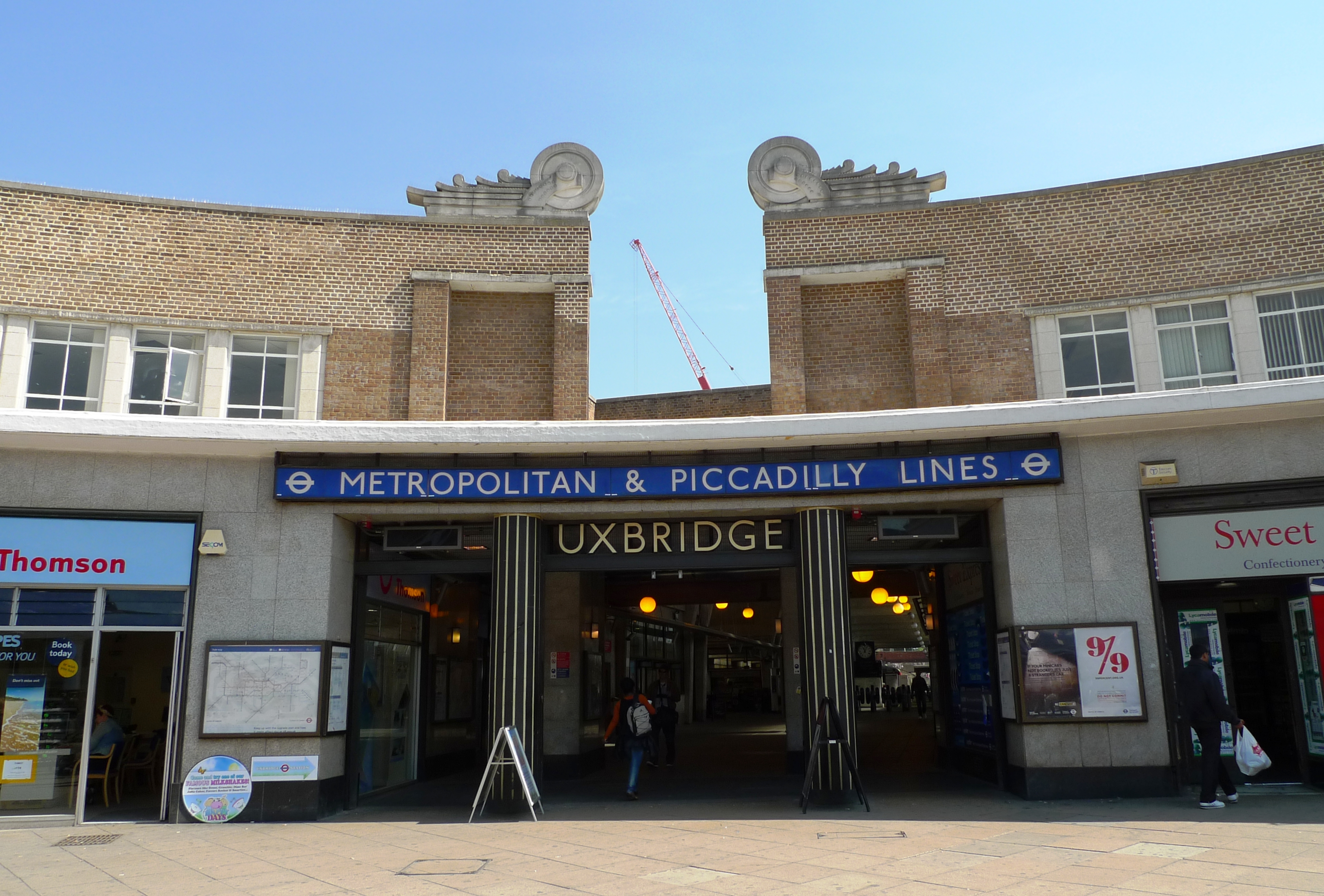
- The main entrance to Uxbridge tube station in May 2011
- Interactive map of Uxbridge

General information
- Location: Uxbridge
- Local authority: London Borough of Hillingdon
- Managed by: London Underground
- Number of platforms: 4
- Tracks: 3
- Accessible: Yes
- Fare zone: 6

Key dates
- 1904: Opened (Metropolitan)
- 1910: Start (District)
- 1933: End (District)
- 1933: Start (Piccadilly)
- 1938: Moved
- 1 May 1939: Goods yard closed

Listed status
- Listing grade: II
- Entry number: 1358405
- Added to list: 12 January 1983; 43 years ago

Other information
- Coordinates: 51.5459°N 0.4783°W

Uxbridge is a London Underground station, located in Uxbridge in the London Borough of Hillingdon. It is the terminus on its branches of both the Metropolitan and Piccadilly lines. The next station towards Central London is Hillingdon. The station is situated 15.5 miles (24.9 km) west of Charing Cross, and is in London fare zone 6.

The closest station on the Chiltern Line and Central line is West Ruislip. The closest station on the Elizabeth line is West Drayton, Uxbridge was formerly the terminus of a branch of the District line which ran from Ealing Common; the Piccadilly line took over in 1933.

== History ==
The Harrow and Uxbridge Railway (later merged into the Metropolitan Railway) first opened a station in Uxbridge on 4 July 1904 on Belmont Road, a short distance to the north of the existing station. The station was situated on a different track alignment, now used as sidings. The original service from central London was provided by steam-drawn trains but electrification took place the following year.

The original Uxbridge station at Belmont Road in October 1933

The London United Tramways extension from Shepherd's Bush was opened a few weeks before the underground station. The manager, as reported in a local newspaper at the time, commented on the high prices of the underground journey: "The tram journey took well over an hour to reach Shepherd's Bush".

On 1 March 1910, an extension of the District line from South Harrow to connect with the Metropolitan Railway at Rayners Lane was opened, enabling District line trains to serve stations between Rayners Lane and Uxbridge. The original Belmont Road station had two platforms, and after the introduction of shared operation one platform was used by each line.

On 23 October 1933 District line services to Uxbridge were replaced by Piccadilly line trains.

On 4 December 1938 the current station was opened on a new alignment.

On 12 January 1983, the station buildings were given Grade II listed status.

The London Borough of Hillingdon announced in June 2011 that it would be lobbying Transport for London to have the Central line diverted from West Ruislip station to Uxbridge. Such a project would require a business case approved by TfL and the completion of signal upgrade work on the Metropolitan line.

== Design ==
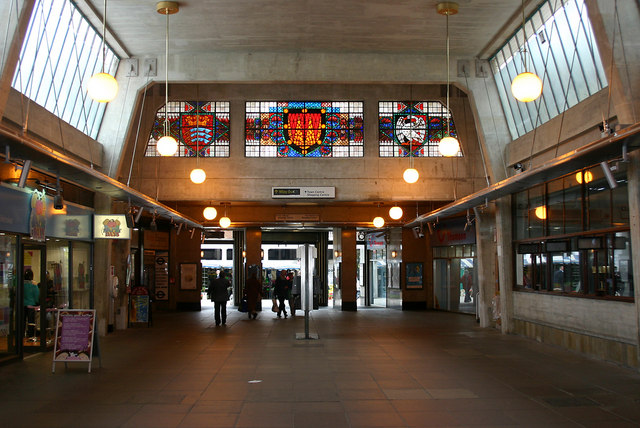
Ticket hall in April 2009 looking towards Uxbridge High Street entrance following refurbishment

The station was designed by Charles Holden with L H Bucknell and features a red-brick facade with paired sculptures by Joseph Armitage over the entrance, representing stylised "winged wheels" with leaf springs. A tall concrete canopy arches over the tracks with a row of clerestory windows above the platforms. The canopy at Uxbridge is similar to the one at Cockfosters, the terminus at the other end of the Piccadilly line. The station is below street level in a cutting.

The stained glass panels by Erwin Bossanyi at the booking hall end of the platforms reflect the area's heraldic associations. The crown and three seaxes on a red background are the arms of Middlesex County Council and the chained swan on a black and red background is associated with Buckinghamshire. The centre shield is possibly the arms of the local Basset family; a downward-pointing red triangle on a gold background was borrowed from the Bassett arms for use on the arms of Uxbridge Urban District Council in 1948.

The forecourt of the new station was originally laid out to provide a turning circle for trolleybuses, which replaced trams in 1936. Ticket barriers are in operation.

== Services ==
Uxbridge station is the terminus on its branches of both the Metropolitan and Piccadilly lines in London fare zone 6. The next station is Hillingdon to the east.

=== Metropolitan line ===
The Metropolitan line is the only line in the network to operate an express service, though currently for trains on the Uxbridge branch this is eastbound only in the morning peaks (06:30 to 09:30) Monday to Friday.

The off-peak service in trains per hour (tph) is:

- 8 tph to Aldgate (all stations)
- 8 tph terminating at Uxbridge

The morning peak service in trains per hour (tph) is:

- 2 tph to Aldgate (semi-fast)
- 4 tph to Aldgate (all stations)
- 4 tph to Baker Street (all stations)
- 10 tph terminating at Uxbridge

The evening peak service in trains per hour (tph) is:

- 7 tph to Aldgate (all stations)
- 3 tph to Baker Street (all stations)
- 10 tph terminating at Uxbridge

=== Piccadilly line ===
The off-peak service in trains per hour (tph) is:

- 3 tph to Cockfosters
- 3 tph terminating at Uxbridge

The peak time service in trains per hour (tph) is:

- 6 tph to Cockfosters
- 6 tph terminating at Uxbridge

Preceding station	London Underground	Following station
Terminus	Metropolitan line Uxbridge branch	Hillingdon towards Baker Street or Aldgate
Terminus	Piccadilly line Uxbridge branch	Hillingdon towards Cockfosters or Arnos Grove
Former services
Preceding station	London Underground	Following station
Terminus	District line (1910–1933)	Hillingdon towards Upminster

== Connections ==
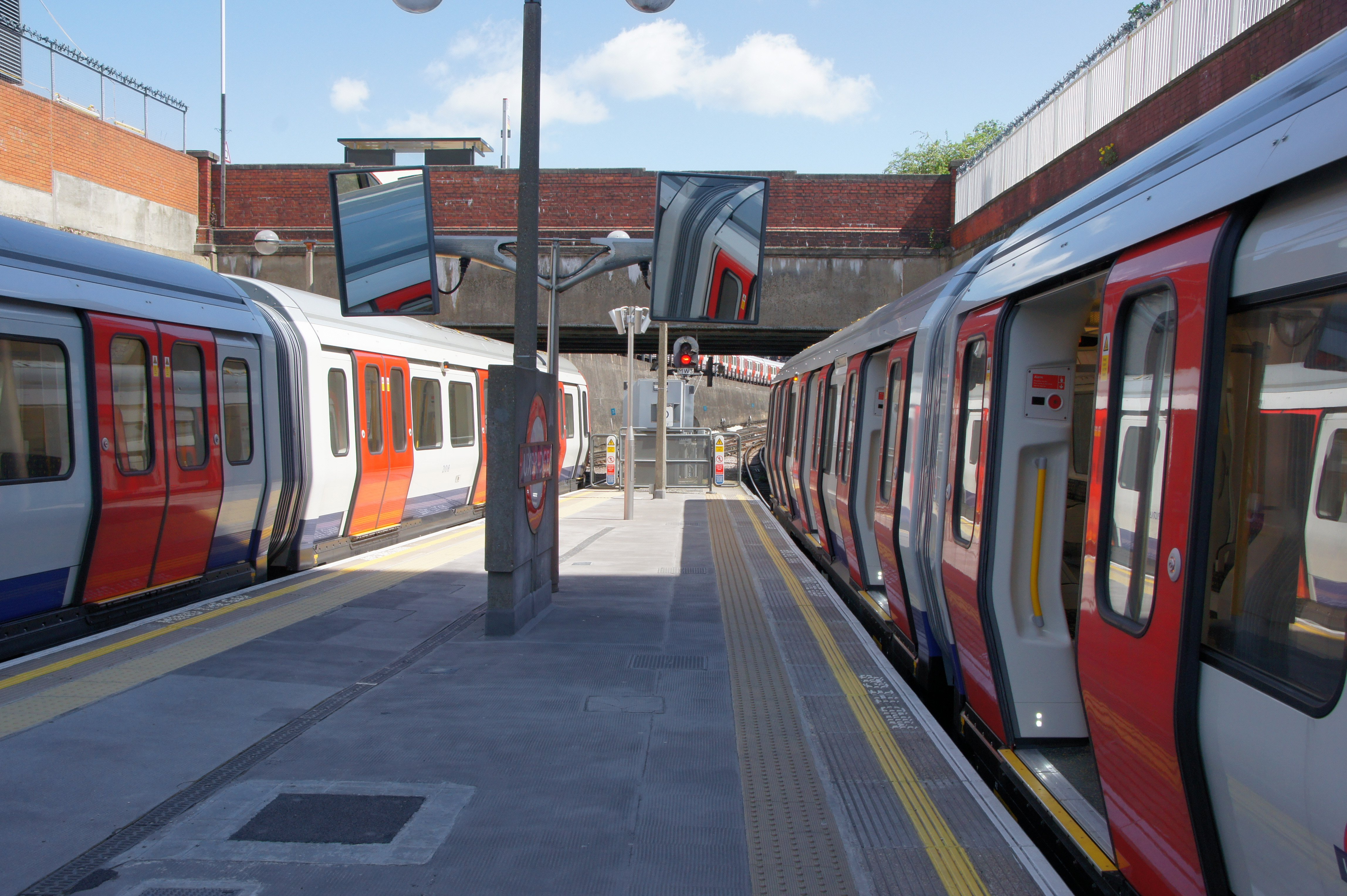
Platforms 3 (right) and 4 looking east

London Buses routes 222, 331, 427, A10, U1, U2, U3, U4, U5, U7, U9 and U10, Superloop route SL8 and night route N207 serve the station. These provide connections with areas such as Acton, Cowley, Cranford, Denham, Ealing, Hanwell, Harefield, Harmondsworth, Hayes, Heathrow Airport, Hillingdon, Hounslow, Ickenham, Northwood, Ruislip, Shepherd's Bush, Sipson, Southall, West Drayton and White City.

In addition, non-London Buses routes serving the station are Carousel Buses routes 101, 102 and 104 to Beaconsfield and High Wycombe/Heathrow Airport, 581 to Higher Denham, 583 to Iver; First Beeline route 3 to Slough and Green Line Coaches route 724 between Harlow and Heathrow Airport.

== See also ==
- Uxbridge High Street railway station
- Uxbridge Vine Street railway station
