= Piccadilly line =

London Underground line

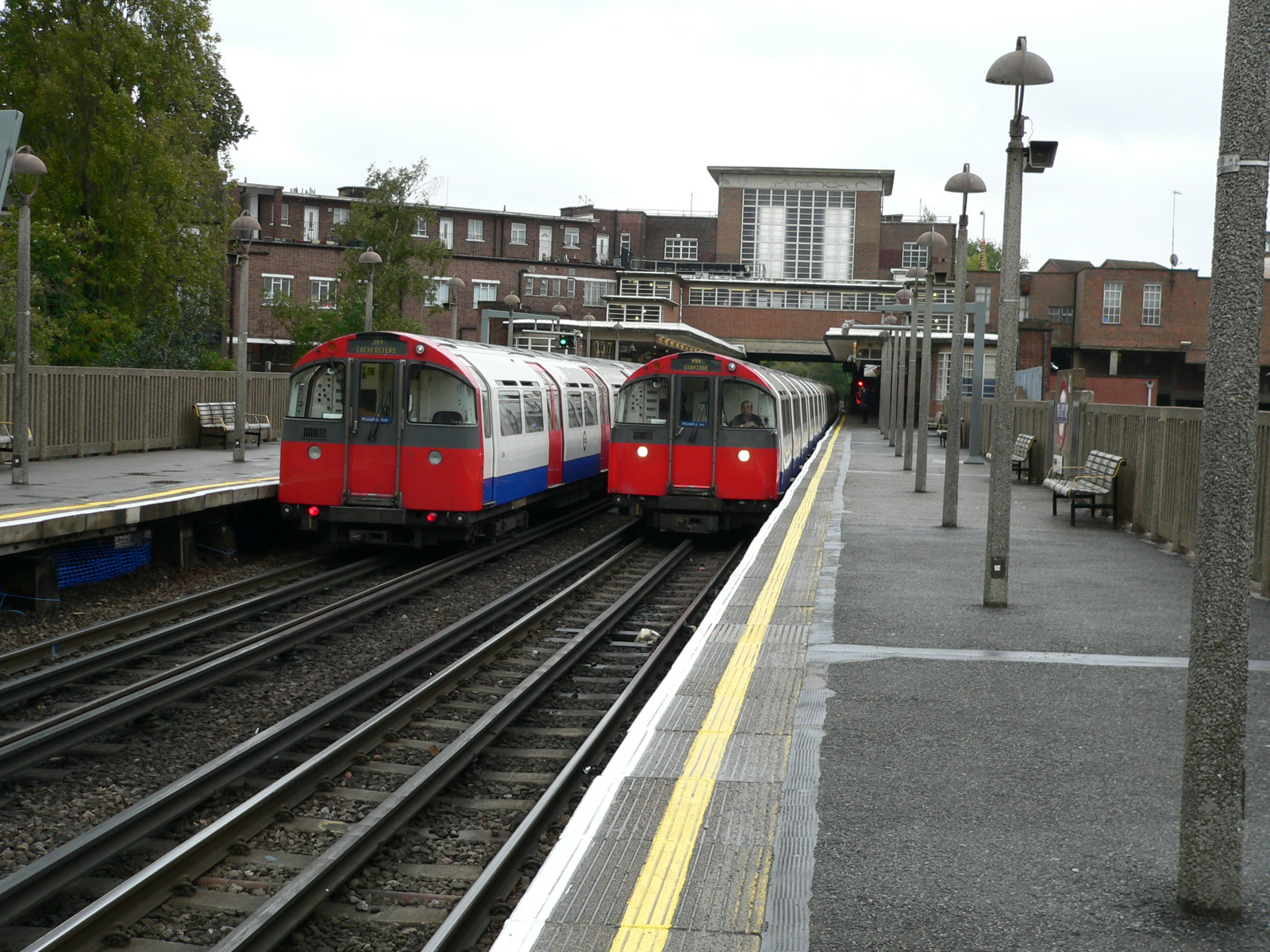
- Two Piccadilly line trains bound for Uxbridge and Cockfosters respectively at Rayners Lane (2005)

Overview
- Termini: Cockfosters; Uxbridge; Heathrow Airport
- Stations: 53
- Colour on map: Dark blue
- Website: tfl.gov.uk/tube/route/piccadilly/

Service
- Type: Rapid transit
- System: London Underground
- Depots: Cockfosters; Northfields
- Rolling stock: 1973 Stock
- Ridership: 217.995 million (2019) passenger journeys

History
- Opened: 15 December 1906; 119 years ago
- Last extension: 27 March 2008

Technical
- Line length: 45.96 mi (73.97 km)
- Character: Deep-level tube
- Track gauge: 1,435 mm (4 ft 8 1/2 in) standard gauge
- Electrification: Fourth rail, 630 V DC
- Operating speed: 40–50 mph (64–80 km/h)
Transport for London rail lines
London Underground
Bakerloo
Central
Circle
District
Hammersmith & City
Jubilee
Metropolitan
Northern
Piccadilly
Victoria
Waterloo & City
London Overground
Liberty
Lioness
Mildmay
Suffragette
Weaver
Windrush
Other TfL Modes
DLR
Elizabeth line
London Trams

The Piccadilly line is a deep-level London Underground line which runs between the west and the north of London with 53 stations on the line. The line serves Heathrow Airport, and some of its stations are near tourist attractions in Central London such as King's Cross, Piccadilly Circus and Buckingham Palace. It has two western branches which split at Acton Town, with the main one towards Heathrow Airport terminals and the other northern branch towards Uxbridge. The District and Metropolitan lines share some sections of track with the Piccadilly line. The line is printed in dark blue (officially "Corporate Blue", Pantone 072) on the Tube map. It is the sixth-busiest line on the Underground network, with nearly 218 million passenger journeys in 2019.

The first section, between Finsbury Park and Hammersmith, was opened in 1906 as the Great Northern, Piccadilly and Brompton Railway (GNP&BR). The station tunnels and buildings were designed by Leslie Green, featuring ox-blood terracotta facades with semi-circular windows on the first floor. When Underground Electric Railways of London (UERL) took over the line, it was renamed the Piccadilly line. Subsequent extensions were made to Cockfosters, Hounslow West and Uxbridge in the early 1930s, when many existing stations on the Uxbridge and Hounslow branches were rebuilt to designs by Charles Holden of the Adams, Holden & Pearson architectural practice. These were generally rectangular, with brick bases and large tiled windows, topped with a concrete slab roof. The western extensions took over certain existing District line services, which were fully withdrawn in 1964.

Stations in central London were rebuilt to cater for a higher volume of passenger traffic. To prepare for the Second World War, some stations were equipped with shelters and basic amenities, and others with blast walls. Construction of the Victoria line, the first section of which opened in 1968, helped to relieve congestion on the Piccadilly line; some sections of the Piccadilly had to be rerouted for cross-platform interchange with the new line. Several plans were made to extend the Piccadilly line to serve Heathrow Airport. The earliest approval was given in 1967, and the Heathrow extension opened in stages between 1975 and 1977. This served only Terminals 2 and 3 and the former Terminal 1. The line was extended again twice, to Terminal 4 via a loop in 1986, and to Terminal 5 directly from the main terminal station in 2008.

This line has two depots, at Northfields and Cockfosters, with a group of sidings at several locations. There are crossovers at a number of locations, some of which allow trains to switch to different lines. The Piccadilly line's electric power was formerly generated at Lots Road Power Station. This was taken out of use in 2003, and the line is now powered from the National Grid network. 1973 Stock trains are used on the line, 78 of which are needed to operate a 24 trains per hour (tph) service (a train every 2 1/2 minutes) during peak hours. These trains are due to be replaced by 2024 Stock in 2026.

== Route ==
The Piccadilly line is a 45.96 mi (73.97 km) long north–west line, with two western branches splitting at Acton Town, serving 53 stations. At the northern end, Cockfosters is a four-platform three-track terminus, and the line runs at surface level to just south of Oakwood. Southgate station is in a tunnel, with tunnel portals to the north and south. Due to the difference in terrain, a viaduct carries the tracks through Arnos Park to Arnos Grove. The line then descends into twin tube tunnels, passing through Wood Green, Finsbury Park and central London. The central area contains stations close to tourist attractions, such as the London Transport Museum, Harrods, Buckingham Palace and Piccadilly Circus. The 9.51 mi (15.3 km) tunnel ends east of Barons Court, where the line continues west, parallel to the District line, to Acton Town. A flying junction, in use since 10 February 1910, separates trains going to the Heathrow branch from the Uxbridge branch.

The Heathrow branch remains at surface level until the eastern approach to Hounslow West station, where it enters a cut-and-cover tunnel. West of Hatton Cross, the line enters tube tunnels to Heathrow Airport and branches to the Terminal 4 loop or to a terminus at Terminal 5. On the Uxbridge branch, the line shares tracks with the District line between Acton Town and south of North Ealing. Traversing terrain with cuttings and embankments, it continues to Uxbridge, sharing tracks with the Metropolitan line between Rayners Lane and Uxbridge. The distance between Cockfosters and Uxbridge is 31.6 mi (50.9 km).

=== Map ===
The route of the Piccadilly line

== History ==
The Piccadilly line began as the Great Northern, Piccadilly and Brompton Railway (GNP&BR), one of several railways controlled by the Underground Electric Railways Company of London (UERL), whose chief director was Charles Tyson Yerkes, although he died before the first section of the line opened. It currently runs on tracks built by The GNP&BR, the District Railway (DR) and the Metropolitan Railway (Met), and received major extensions in the 1930s and 1970s.

The GNP&BR was formed from the merger of two earlier, but unbuilt, tube-railway companies taken over in 1901 by Yerkes's consortium: the Great Northern & Strand Railway (GN&SR) and the Brompton & Piccadilly Circus Railway (B&PCR). The GN&SR's and B&PCR's separate routes were linked with an additional section between Piccadilly Circus and Holborn. A section of the DR's scheme for a deep-level tube line between South Kensington and Earl's Court was also added in order to complete the route. (Note: The original District Railway tube line was to be from Earl's Court to Mansion House. It was intended to be an express route from South Kensington to Mansion House, with an intermediate station at Embankment.) This finalised route, between Finsbury Park and Hammersmith stations, was formally opened on 15 December 1906. On 30 November 1907, the short branch from Holborn to the Strand (later renamed Aldwych) opened; it had been planned as the last section of the GN&SR before the amalgamation with the B&PCR.

Initial ridership growth was low due to high use of new electric trams and motor buses. Financial stability was an issue, and as a result the company heavily promoted their railways via a new management team. UERL also agreed with other independent railway companies such as the Central London Railway (CLR, now part of the Central line) to jointly advertise a combined network known as the Underground. On 1 July 1910, the GNP&BR and the other UERL-owned tube railways (the Baker Street and Waterloo Railway and the Charing Cross, Euston and Hampstead Railway) were merged by the London Electric Railway Amalgamation Act 1910 (10 Edw. 7 & 1 Geo. 5. c. xxxii) to become the London Electric Railway Company (LER). (Note: The merger was carried out by transferring the assets of the CCE&HR and the BS&WR to the GNP&BR and renaming the GNP&BR as the London Electric Railway.) The Underground railways still suffered financial issues, and to address this, the London Passenger Transport Board was established on 1 July 1933.

There were significant station layout changes in the 1910s and 1920s. On 4 October 1911, Earl's Court had new escalators installed connecting the District and Piccadilly lines. They were the first to be installed on the Underground. On 10 December 1928, a rebuilt Piccadilly Circus station, designed by Charles Holden, was opened. This included a new booking hall located below ground and eleven escalators, replacing the original lifts. (Note: The old street level station building closed on 21 July 1929.)

One of the shafts at Holloway Road station was used as an experiment for spiral escalators, but never used. An experiment to encourage passengers to step on the escalator three at a time at Manor House station was trialled. It failed due to opposition and potential dangers pointed out by the public.

=== Extension to Cockfosters ===
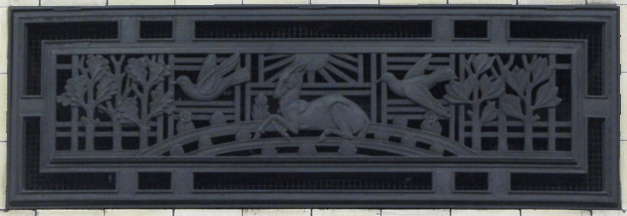
One of the ventilation panels at Wood Green station platforms

While early plans to serve Wood Green (specifically Alexandra Palace) existed since the 1890s as part of the GN&SR, this section to Finsbury Park was later dropped from the GNP&BR proposal in 1902 when the GN&SR was merged with the B&PCR. In 1902, as part of an agreement for taking over the GN&SR, the Great Northern Railway (GNR) imposed a sanction on Yerkes to abandon the section north of Finsbury Park and they would construct the terminus below ground. Finsbury Park remained as an overcrowded terminus of the line, and was described as "intolerable". Many passengers arriving at both stations had to change onto buses, trams, and suburban rail services to complete their journeys further north. (Note: The diagram in the reference shows bus or tram routes in the north which were in close proximity to Finsbury Park.) The GNR attempted to address this issue by considering electrification several times, but to no avail due to shortage of funds. Meanwhile, the LER proposed an extension in 1920 but was overruled by the GNR, which was widely regarded as "unreasonable". In 1923, a petition by the Middlesex Federation of Ratepayers to repeal the 1902 act of Parliament emerged. It was reported that a "fierce exchange of arguments" occurred during a parliamentary session in March 1924 to request this change. Frank Pick, as the new assistant managing director of the Underground, distributed photographs of the congestion at Finsbury Park to the press. All of this pressure finally prompted the government to initiate "The North and North-East London Traffic Inquiry", with initial reports only recommending a one-station extension to Manor House. The London and North Eastern Railway (LNER), being the successor of the GNR, was placed in the position of electrifying its own services or withdrawing its veto of an extension of the Piccadilly line. With funds still being insufficient to electrify the railway, the LNER reluctantly agreed to the latter. An extension was highly likely at this stage, based on a study in October 1925 by the London & Home Counties Traffic Advisory Committee.

London Electric Metropolitan District Central London and City and South London Railway Companies Act 1930
- Act of Parliament
- Parliament of the United Kingdom
- Long title: An Act to empower the London Electric Railway Company to construct new railways subways and works and to raise additional moneys to empower the Metropolitan District Railway Company to construct widenings of portions of its railway and to raise additional moneys to empower the Central London Railway Company to construct subways and works and to raise additional moneys to empower the City and South London Railway Company and the Metropolitan District Railway Company to construct a subway and to confer further powers on the said and other companies and for other purposes.
- Citation: 20 & 21 Geo. 5. c. lxxxviii

Dates
- Royal assent: 4 June 1930

Text of statute as originally enacted

Pick, together with the Underground board, began working on the extension proposal. Much pressure was also received from a few districts such as Tottenham and Harringay, but it was decided that the optimal route would be the midpoint of the GNR and the Hertford Line. (Note: An interchange at Manor House was provided instead for connecting trams to Edmonton, Tottenham and Enfield East.) This was backed by the committee, and parliamentary approval for the extension was obtained on 4 June 1930, under the London Electric Metropolitan District Central London and City and South London Railway Companies Act 1930 (20 & 21 Geo. 5. c. lxxxviii). (Note: LNER continued to oppose the decision, and promised to electrify the line if the extension was rejected.) Funding was obtained from legislation under the Development (Loan Guarantees and Grants) Act 1929 (20 & 21 Geo. 5. c. 7) instead of the Trade Facilities Act. The extension would pass through Manor House, Wood Green and Southgate, ending at Enfield West (now Oakwood); (Note: It was intended for the station to be named East Barnet, but was quickly renamed before opening. Alternative suggestions were Merryhills and Oakwood. The station was gradually renamed, to Enfield West (Oakwood) on 3 May 1934, and to its present name on 1 September 1946.) based on the absence of property development along the line. In November 1929, the projected terminus was shifted further north to Cockfosters to accommodate a larger depot. It was estimated that ridership on the extension, which would cost £4.4 million, would be 36 million passengers a year. In addition to Enfield West, stations were designated at Southgate, Arnos Grove, Bounds Green, Wood Green, Turnpike Lane, and Manor House. Bounds Green station was almost cancelled in order to improve journey times. A more expensive provision was rejected, which included construction of a third track between Finsbury Park and Wood Green. Furthermore, since journey speed was a primary consideration in decision-making for the extension, the pencilled-in and much lobbied-for additional station near the corner of Green Lanes and St. Ann's Road in Harringay was dropped.

Tunnel rings, cabling and concrete were produced in Northern England, while unemployed industrial workers there helped in the construction of the extension. Construction of the extension started quickly, with the boring of the twin tube tunnels between Arnos Grove and Finsbury Park proceeding at the rate of a mile per month. Twenty-two tunnelling shields were used for the tunnels, and tunnel diameters were slightly larger than the old section, at 12 ft (3.7 m). Sharp curves were also avoided to promote higher average speeds on the extension. Platforms 400 ft (120 m) long were originally planned for each station to fit 8-car trains, but were cut short to 385 ft (117 m) when built. Some stations were also built with wider platform tunnels to cater to expected high patronage. To connect with buses and trams, interchange stations were provided with exits which led passengers directly to the bus terminal or tram stop from the subsurface ticket hall. The exits were purposed to improve connections which avoided chaotic passenger flow such as at Finsbury Park. Wood Green was an exception due to engineering difficulties, with the ticket hall at street level instead. Ventilation shafts were provided at Finsbury Park Tennis Courts, Colina Road and Nightingale Road, supplementing the existing fans within the stations. Provisions for future branch lines to Enfield and Tottenham were made at Wood Green and Manor House respectively, both to have reversing sidings. This had since changed, with only a reversing siding built at Wood Green and no provision for the branch line. Arnos Grove was built to have four platforms facing three tracks for trains to reverse regularly, with seven stabling sidings instead of one reversing siding and two platforms.

Most of the tunnelling works were completed by October 1931, with the Wood Green and Bounds Green station tunnels done by the end of the year. The first phase of the extension to Arnos Grove opened on 19 September 1932, without ceremony. The line was further extended to Enfield West on 13 March 1933 and finally to Cockfosters on 31 July 1933, again without ceremonies. The total length of the extension was 7.6 mi (12.3 km). Free tickets were distributed to residents on the first days of service on each extension. Initial ridership was 25 million at the end of 1933, which sharply increased to 70 million by 1951. Despite there being no official opening ceremonies, the Prince of Wales visited the extension on 14 February 1933. (Note: He travelled from Piccadilly Circus to Wood Green, and back to Hyde Park Corner for inspection.)

=== Westward extensions ===
The Hounslow West (then Hounslow Barracks) extension of the Piccadilly line, together with the Uxbridge extension, aimed to improve services on the District line which at the time were serving both branches from Acton Town (then Mill Hill Park). (Note: The Hounslow & Metropolitan Railway originally opened a shuttle service between Mill Hill Park and Hounslow Town on 1 May 1883, with a single-track branch to Hounslow Barracks which opened on 21 July 1884. The route to Hounslow Town eventually closed on 2 May 1909. The District Railway took over the branches in 1903.) The Uxbridge extension followed along existing routes on the DR and Met. The DR opened a spur from Ealing Common to South Harrow in June 1903. The Met opened its extension to Uxbridge in July 1904. Through trains of the DR were eventually extended to Uxbridge on 1 March 1910, henceforth sharing tracks with the Met between Rayners Lane and Uxbridge. (Note: The Ealing & South Harrow Railway (E&SHR) was approved in 1894 and completed in 1899 after approximately a two-year construction period. Insufficient funds from the DR delayed its opening. On the other hand, the Harrow & Uxbridge Railway (H&UR) was proposed in 1896 and authorised a year later. The Met offered to fund the line, with conditions to take over the Rayners Lane to Uxbridge section of the H&UR. Agreement was reached in 1899, with the Met also constructing the connection from South Harrow to Rayners Lane, whilst allowing up to three trains an hour from the DR between South Harrow and Uxbridge. Construction began in 1901, and the Met opened its extension to Uxbridge on 4 July 1904.)

The viaduct from Studland Road Junction west of Hammersmith to Turnham Green was quadrupled on 3 November 1911. The London and South Western Railway (L&SWR) used the northern pair of tracks while the District Railway used the southern pair. The LER proposed an extension in November 1912 to Richmond due to available capacity to the west and the fact that passenger interchanges were large at Hammersmith. It would connect with the L&SWR tracks at Turnham Green. It was approved as the London Electric Railway Act 1913 (3 & 4 Geo. 5. c. xcvii) on 15 August 1913, but World War I resulted in no works done on the extension. A parliamentary report of 1919 recommended through running to Richmond and Ealing. The Richmond extension plan was revived in 1922 by Lord Ashfield, the Underground's chairman. It was decided that the Piccadilly line extension was favourable over the CLR's as it was cheaper and had more capacity available. (Note: The CLR also had its Richmond extension proposal passed on the same day as the LER's. Nothing was done either. The L&SWR section ceased operation in 1916 and its ownership was transferred to the Southern Railway in 1923. The CLR, by the 1920s, had capacity constraints due to increased patronage from Ealing and congestion in the central section.) By 1925, the District line was running out of capacity west of Hammersmith, where services were headed to South Harrow, Hounslow Barracks, Richmond and Ealing Broadway. Demand was also low on the South Harrow branch because of infrequent services and competition among other rail lines in the vicinity of each station. This prompted the Piccadilly line extension to be an express service between Hammersmith and Acton Town, with the future Heathrow Airport extension safeguarded in 40 years' time. The Piccadilly line would run on the inner pair of tracks, and the District line on the outer. Permission was granted to quadruple tracks to Acton Town in 1926 in conjunction with permit renewal for the extension. The Richmond extension never happened, but provisions allocated would allow this option to be revisited later. Extensions would instead be to Hounslow Barracks and South Harrow, taking over DR services to the latter, with an estimated cost of £2.3 million. (Note: The District line instead focused on running trains to Richmond, Ealing Broadway and Wimbledon, with the South Harrow to Uxbridge and Acton Town to South Acton shuttles to remain. In October 1930, provision was also made to have rush hour DR services to South Harrow.) In 1930, unsuccessful negotiations were made between LER and the Met to extend Piccadilly line trains to Rayners Lane for passengers to change trains.

In 1929, quadrupling was to extend to Northfields for express trains to terminate there. This work was completed on 18 December 1932. Overall works for the extension began in 1931, approximately a year after permission was granted and funded under the Development (Loan Guarantees and Grants) Act 1929 (20 & 21 Geo. 5. c. 7). The Studland Road Junction area was partially rebuilt, with some of the old viaducts retained to date. The junctions diverging to Richmond were reconfigured at Turnham Green. Reversing facilities were initially designated at the latter, but these were not built. Trial runs of Piccadilly line trains began on 27 June 1932. On 4 July 1932, services were extended to South Harrow, which replaced DR services. Northfields services were introduced on 9 January 1933, and on 13 March, were extended to Hounslow West. On 1 July 1933, the London Passenger Transport Board (LPTB) was formed, which included the Met, the DR and LER. The board decided that there was sufficient demand to run through trains to Uxbridge due to rapidly developing suburbs along the line. The extension of Piccadilly line trains to Uxbridge began on 23 October 1933, but with many trains still reversing at South Harrow. By then, most Piccadilly line trains continued beyond Hammersmith, and District line trains to Hounslow were reduced to off-peak shuttles to Acton Town. An enhanced off-peak Piccadilly line service was introduced on 29 April 1935, cutting off-peak District line services down to the Acton Town–South Acton shuttle. South Harrow short trips proved to be an inconvenience. The solution was to move reversing facilities to Rayners Lane. A new reversing siding was built there in 1935, which allowed some peak hour trains to terminate beginning in May 1936. Regular reversals were fully implemented in October 1943. Peak-hour District line trains to Hounslow were fully withdrawn on 9 October 1964.

=== Modernisation, World War II and Victoria line ===
In conjunction with the new extensions, several stations were considered for closure to increase overall line speeds. Down Street closed on 21 May 1932, Brompton Road on 29 July 1934, and York Road on 17 September 1932. All three stations were lightly used. Down Street and Brompton Road were replaced, respectively, by relocated entrances at Hyde Park Corner and Knightsbridge. Knightsbridge's new below-ground ticket hall required stairwells from the entrance, one of which took over part of the Barclays Bank branch there. Both of the latter two stations retained their existing platforms, but the access from the surface was reconstructed with their entrances closer to the closed stations. These new entrances were provided with escalators, which replaced the lifts, improving passenger circulation. The Aldwych branch was deemed unprofitable. In 1929, an extension to Waterloo was approved, costed at £750,000, but no progress was made on its construction. Dover Street (now Green Park), Leicester Square and Holborn stations received new sets of escalators, the latter having four in a single shaft. These were completed in the early 1930s. As part of the 1935–40 New Works Programme, Earl's Court was largely reconstructed at street level. At King's Cross St Pancras, the Piccadilly and Northern lines were finally connected via new escalators, albeit with construction delayed due to financial difficulties. (Note: The four escalators led passengers down from the ticket hall to the new Central line concourse, and a further three to the Piccadilly line concourse.) As a result, Russell Square station retained its lifts.

To prepare for the Second World War, several stations had blast walls added. Others, such as Green Park, Knightsbridge and King's Cross St Pancras, had floodgates installed. The line was also involved in the evacuation of 200,000 children, by transporting them towards both ends of the line, then transferring them to main line trains to continue their journeys to different country distribution hubs. Some underground stations were fitted with bunk beds, toilets and first aid facilities, and sewerage. The disused Down Street was converted to an underground bunker for government use. Other stations such as Holborn and Earl's Court also had essential wartime uses. The former had the Aldwych branch platforms as the wartime engineering quarters whilst the branch service was temporarily closed. The latter produced Torpedo Data Computers at the transfer concourse between the District and Piccadilly lines. Aldwych station was used as storage for British Museum exhibits. On 13 October 1940, a bomb explosion caused the westbound platform tunnel at Bounds Green station to collapse, killing nineteen shelterers. Train services were suspended for two months.

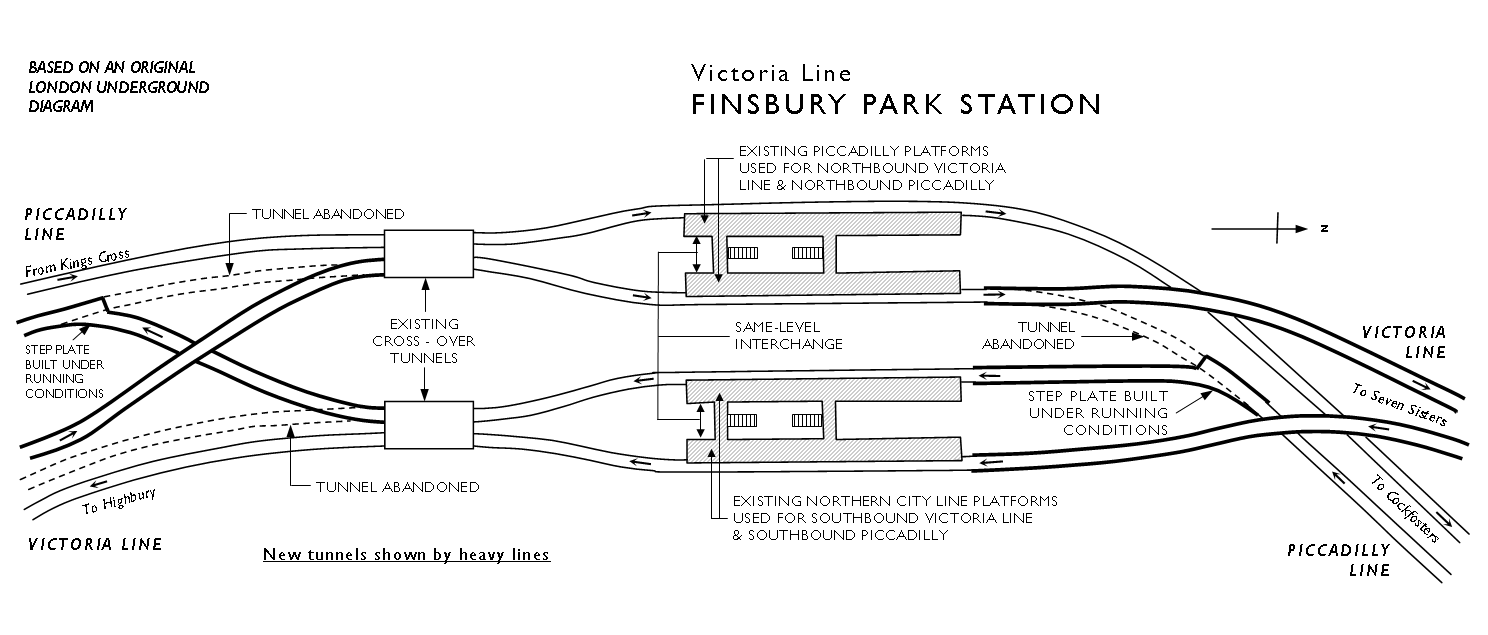
Reconfiguration of tunnels and platforms at Finsbury Park

In preparation for the Victoria line, cross-platform interchange was to be provided at a few stations, which included Finsbury Park on the Piccadilly line. This meant that the Piccadilly line had to be realigned there, and the Northern City line platforms, being parallel to the existing Piccadilly line platforms, were to be transferred to the pair of lines. The Northern City line would be redirected to the surface platforms. The westbound Piccadilly line track would be rerouted onto one of these platforms, with the southbound Victoria line using the other. The northbound Victoria line would reuse the old westbound Piccadilly line platform and a part of the old tunnels, with the Piccadilly line diversion tunnels spanning 3,150 ft (960 m).

Construction of the diversion began in October 1964, with the Northern City line having a temporary closure. At the northern junction, step plate junctions were built to divert the existing line when the new tunnels were complete. They were fitted into the original Northern City line tunnels which had a greater tunnel diameter until two running tunnels were able to merge. The old and unused running tunnel was disconnected and blocked off when the junction tunnel was near its completion. Alteration of temporary points junctions and shifting of signals completed the diversion tunnels. In the south, the Piccadilly would be diverted to descend sharply under the northbound Victoria line tunnel, and then ascending to the original level which had a difference of 5 ft (1.5 m) approximately 200 ft (61 m) north of Arsenal station. The old westbound tunnel had to be supported on a trestle for works to be done. The trestle and old tracks were entirely removed once the diversion was ready for switchover. New tracks were laid at a rapid rate; it was done in about thirteen hours on 3 October 1965. Both lines were connected via junctions south of Finsbury Park for stock movement and engineering trains. It was intended for Green Park to have cross-platform interchange, but was deemed impossible due to the lines crossing at right angles. The Victoria line opened on 1 September 1968 from Walthamstow Central to Highbury & Islington via Finsbury Park, and on 7 March 1969 to Warren Street via King's Cross St Pancras, providing relief to the Piccadilly line.

=== Extension to Heathrow Airport ===
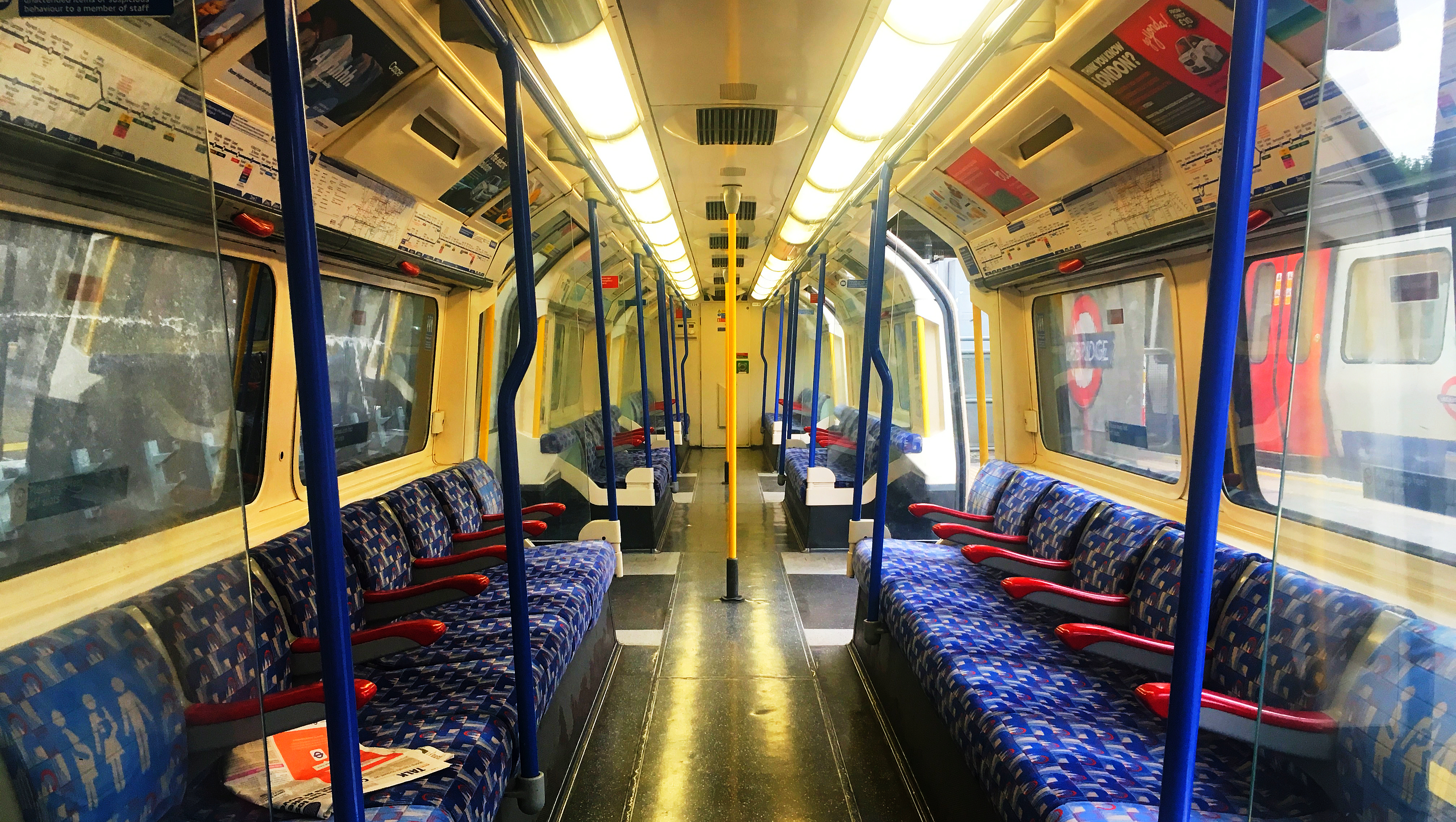
Inside a Piccadilly line car

To cater for the rapid growth of road traffic to Heathrow Airport, several plans for new rail lines to serve the airport were considered. An average increment of 1 million passengers a year between 1953 and 1973, and increasing problems with airline coach services from major terminals due to location, traffic congestion, larger aircraft capacity and increasing leisure travel, further increased the need for public transport connections. Other than the Piccadilly line extension from Hounslow West, (Note: The four-tracking extension to Hounslow East from Northfields was considered in the 1940s to allow Heathrow express trains to run fast into central London. Another express rail link planned by LPTB would terminate at Hyde Park or Earl's Court, which would have costed £5–12 million.) a Southern Railway spur (section now transferred to part of South Western Railway) from Feltham was also contemplated. These schemes were brought into parliamentary discussion in November 1966, and royal assent was granted as the London Transport Act 1967 (c. xxxix) and British Railways Act 1967 (c. xxx) respectively on 27 July 1967. Partial government funding was obtained in April 1972 for the 3.5 mi (5.6 km) Piccadilly line extension, and the estimated cost of construction was £12.3 million.

On 27 April 1971, a construction ceremony was launched by Sir Desmond Plummer, leader of the Greater London Council, by bulldozing "the first sod". Platforms at Hounslow West had to be relocated below ground to the north of the existing platforms for the new track alignment. The 1931 ticket hall was retained, with connections to the new platforms. A cut-and-cover excavation method was used between Hounslow West and Hatton Cross, a new station on the extension. This 2-mile section had a shallow trench dug, with the tunnel walls supported by intersecting concrete piles. The line had to cross the River Crane just east of Hatton Cross; therefore it emerges briefly on a bridge, with the two portals having concrete retaining walls. Deep tube tunnels were bored from Hatton Cross to Heathrow Central (now Heathrow Terminals 2 & 3). On 19 July 1975, the line was extended to Hatton Cross. (Note: Several coach services were redirected to this station from Hounslow West.) The Heathrow Central extension was inaugurated by the Queen around noon on 16 December 1977, with revenue services commencing at 3 pm.

In the 1970s, planning was already under way for a fourth terminal for the airport, and its location was to be to the southeast of the existing terminals. As the Piccadilly line's route to the existing terminals was out of place, a loop track was adopted as the best route to serve the new terminal. The westbound track between Hatton Cross and Heathrow Central would be retained for emergency services. Approval for British Airport Authority (BAA) to construct the fourth terminal was granted in 1979. Permissions for constructing for the loop was approved and received royal assent as the London Transport Act 1981 (c. xxxii) on 30 October 1981. The station box would be built by BAA as part of the £200 million construction cost of the new terminal. By 1982, construction of the fourth terminal building was behind schedule, and in July 1982 the location of the station was moved from below the terminal building to a nearby car park. Construction of the 2.5 mi (4.0 km) extension began on 9 February 1983, with an estimated cost of £24.6 million. Tunnelling for the loop was completed in seventeen months. It was expected that the extension would open with the new terminal. However, the terminal opening was delayed, with the loop service completed and commissioned on 4 November 1985. The terminal and station were finally opened a few months later on 1 April 1986, by the Prince and Princess of Wales. Regular traffic began twelve days later, with trains serving Terminal 4 via a one-way loop to Terminals 1,2,3. The station only has a single platform, the only one with this configuration on the Piccadilly line.

Terminal 5 required another extension, funded by BAA. However, its proposed alignment caused an issue: it was reported that London Underground was unhappy with the terminal's location on the site of the old Perry Oaks sludge works which was originally intended for Terminal 4. It was now impossible for all three terminals to be served on the same route, and the final solution was to have twin tunnels serving Terminal 5 from Terminals 1,2,3. From 7 January 2005 until 17 September 2006, the loop via Terminal 4 was closed to allow this connection to be built. Terminals 1,2,3 became a temporary terminus; shuttle buses served Terminal 4 from the Hatton Cross bus station. Part of the junction between the through and loop tracks needed to be rebuilt. The Terminal 5 project team shut down two aircraft stands from Terminal 3 so that an access shaft could be constructed. The new junction was then built into a concrete box which connected all the underground tunnels. The station and terminal were opened on 27 March 2008, splitting westbound Piccadilly line services into two: one via the Terminal 4 loop, another direct to Terminal 5.

=== Aldwych branch closure ===
Plans to extend the Aldwych branch south to Waterloo were revived several times during the station's life. The extension was considered in 1919 and 1948, but no progress towards constructing the link was made.

In the years after the Second World War, a series of preliminary plans for relieving congestion on the London Underground had considered various east–west routes through the Aldwych area, although other priorities meant that these were never proceeded with. In March 1965, a British Rail and London Transport joint planning committee published "A Railway Plan for London", which proposed a new tube railway, the Fleet line (later renamed the Jubilee line), to join the Bakerloo line at Baker Street then run via Aldwych and into the City of London before heading into south-east London. An interchange was proposed at Aldwych and a second recommendation of the report was the revival of the link from Aldwych to Waterloo. London Transport had already sought parliamentary approval to construct tunnels from Aldwych to Waterloo in November 1964, and in August 1965, parliamentary powers were granted. Detailed planning took place, although public spending cuts led to postponement of the scheme in 1967 before tenders were invited.

With the Aldwych branch receiving no extensions, it remained a lightly used shuttle service from Holborn. The branch was considered for closure many times, but it survived. Saturday services were fully withdrawn on 5 August 1962, leaving the line with a peak hour only shuttle on weekdays. In 1993, The original 1907 lifts, which now failed to meet the safety standards at the time, required replacement at a cost of over £3 million. As a result, in August 1993, a public inquiry was held for closure of the short branch line. On 30 September 1994, the branch was closed to traffic. (Note: The Epping to Ongar section of the Central line also closed on 30 September.) The disused station is now used for commercial filming and as a training facility, with the line retaining its link to the rest of the Piccadilly line.

=== Notable incidents and events ===
==== King's Cross fire ====
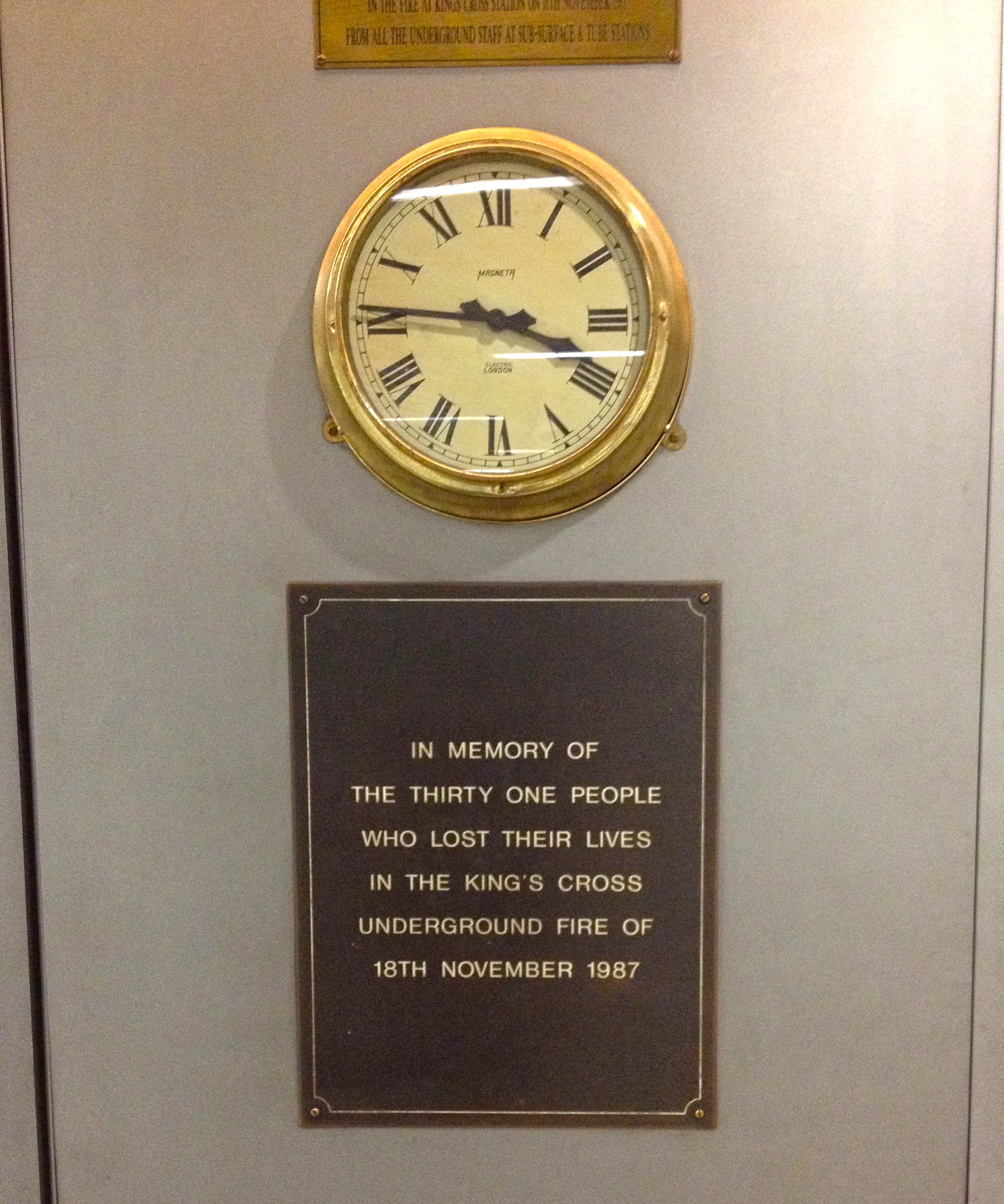
Memorial plaque of the King's Cross fire erected at the station

On 18 November 1987, the large King's Cross fire broke out, the incident being near the Northern/Piccadilly line escalators which killed 31 people. As a result, wooden escalators were replaced at all Underground stations. (Note: All except the two at Greenford station were replaced. These have since been decommissioned on 20 March 2014, being replaced with an inclined lift and an up metal escalator the following year.) The Piccadilly line platforms remained open, but with the escalators to the ticket hall closed for repairs. Access was temporarily via the Victoria line or Midland City platforms. New escalators were fully installed on 27 February 1989.

==== 7 July 2005 London bombings ====
On 7 July 2005, a Piccadilly line train was attacked by suicide bomber Germaine Lindsay in the day's London bombings. The blast occurred at 08:50 BST while the train was between King's Cross St Pancras and Russell Square. It was part of a co-ordinated Islamist terrorist attack on London's transport network, and was synchronised with three other attacks: two on the Circle line and one on a bus at Tavistock Square. The Piccadilly line bomb led to the largest number of fatalities, with 26 people reported killed. Owing to it being a deep-level line, evacuation of station users and access for the emergency services proved difficult. Shuttle services were introduced between Hyde Park Corner and the Heathrow loop, between Acton Town and Rayners Lane, and between Arnos Grove and Cockfosters. Full service was restored on 4 August, four weeks after the bombing.

==== 100-year celebration ====
On 15 December 2006, a 100-year celebration of the Piccadilly line was launched. A birthday card was revealed by Tim O'Toole, then London Underground Managing Director at Leicester Square station.

== Architecture ==
A variety of architecture on Piccadilly line stations

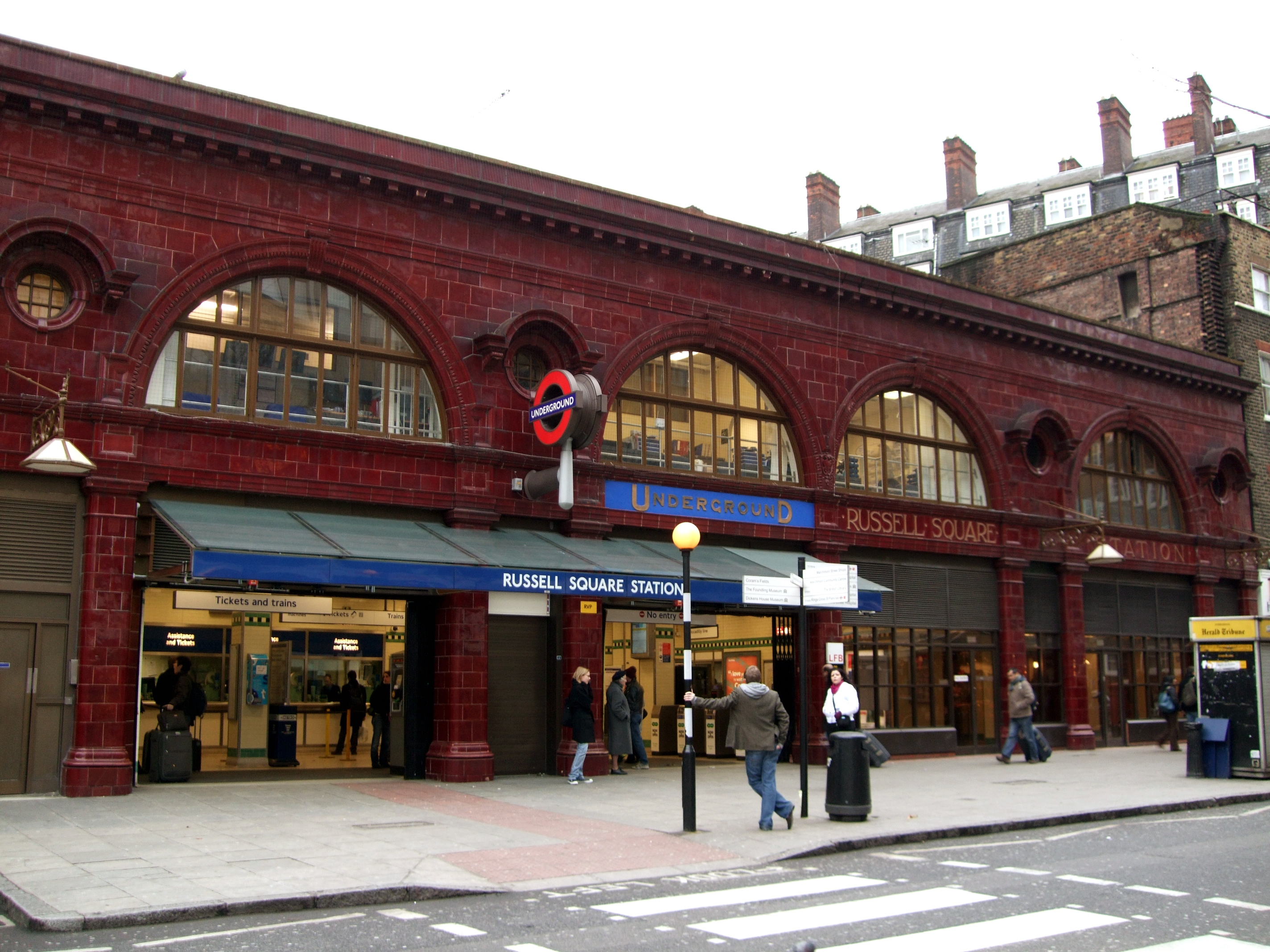
Russell Square, by Leslie Green

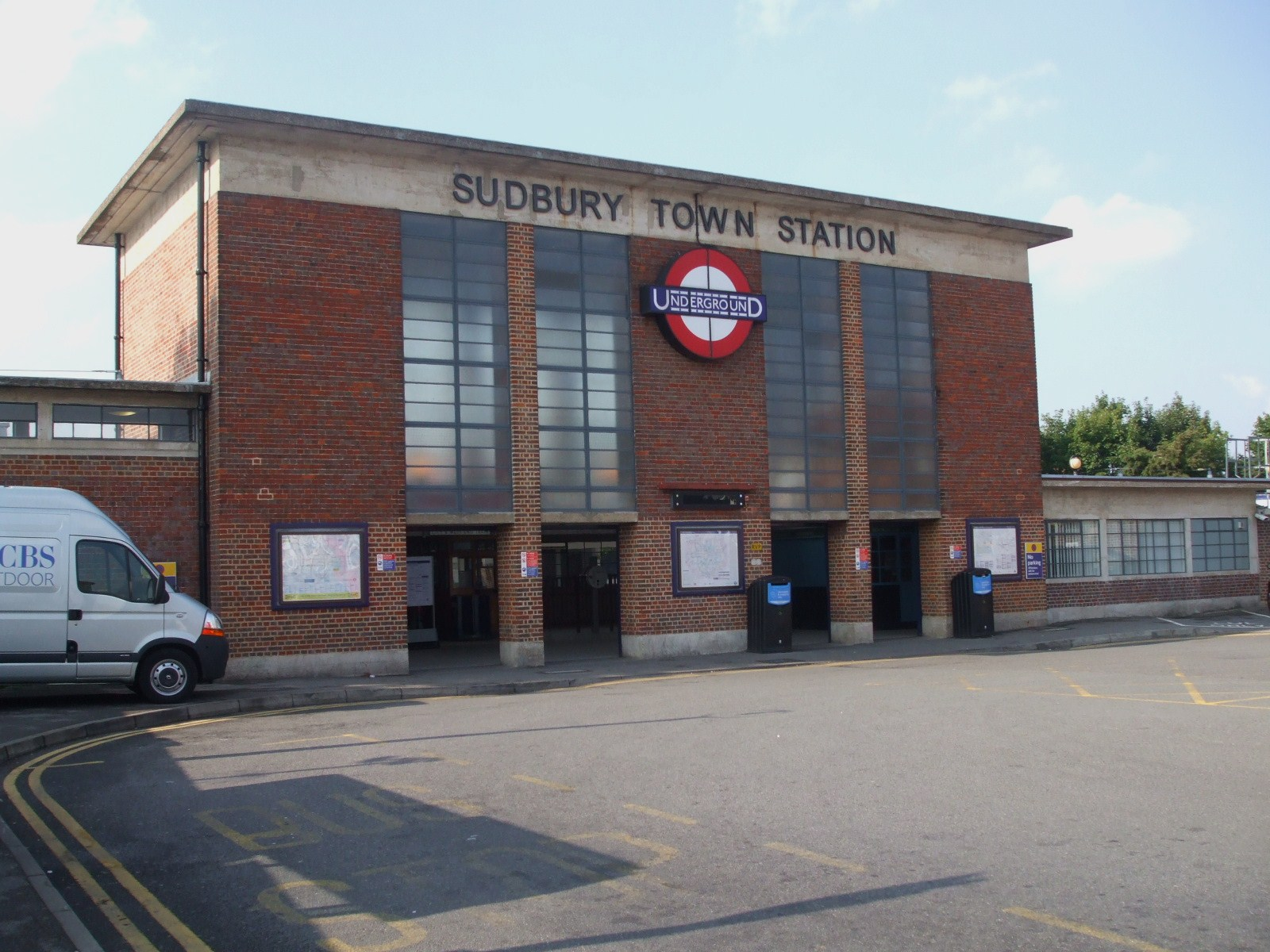
Sudbury Town, the exemplar station

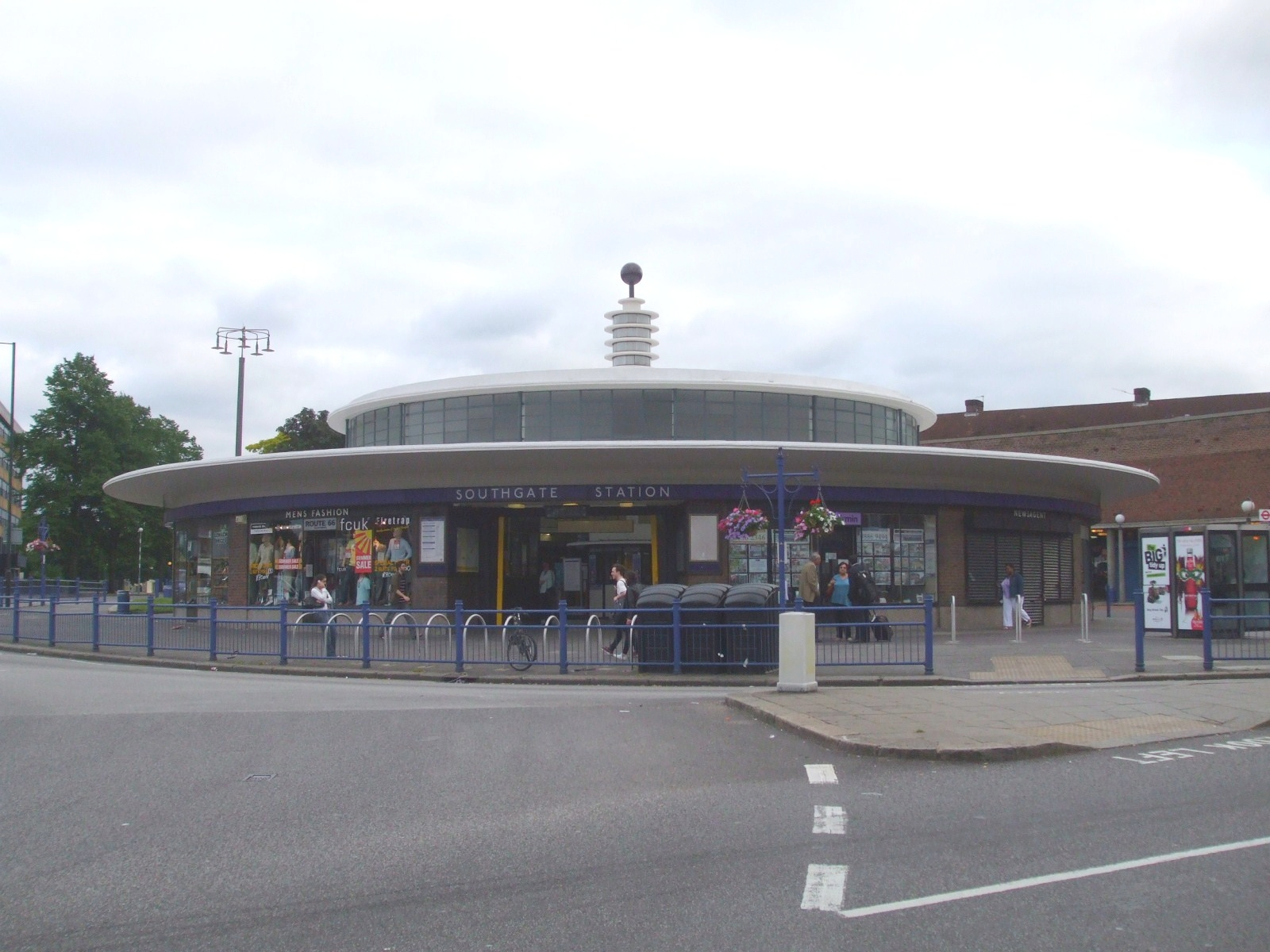
Southgate's unique roof by Holden

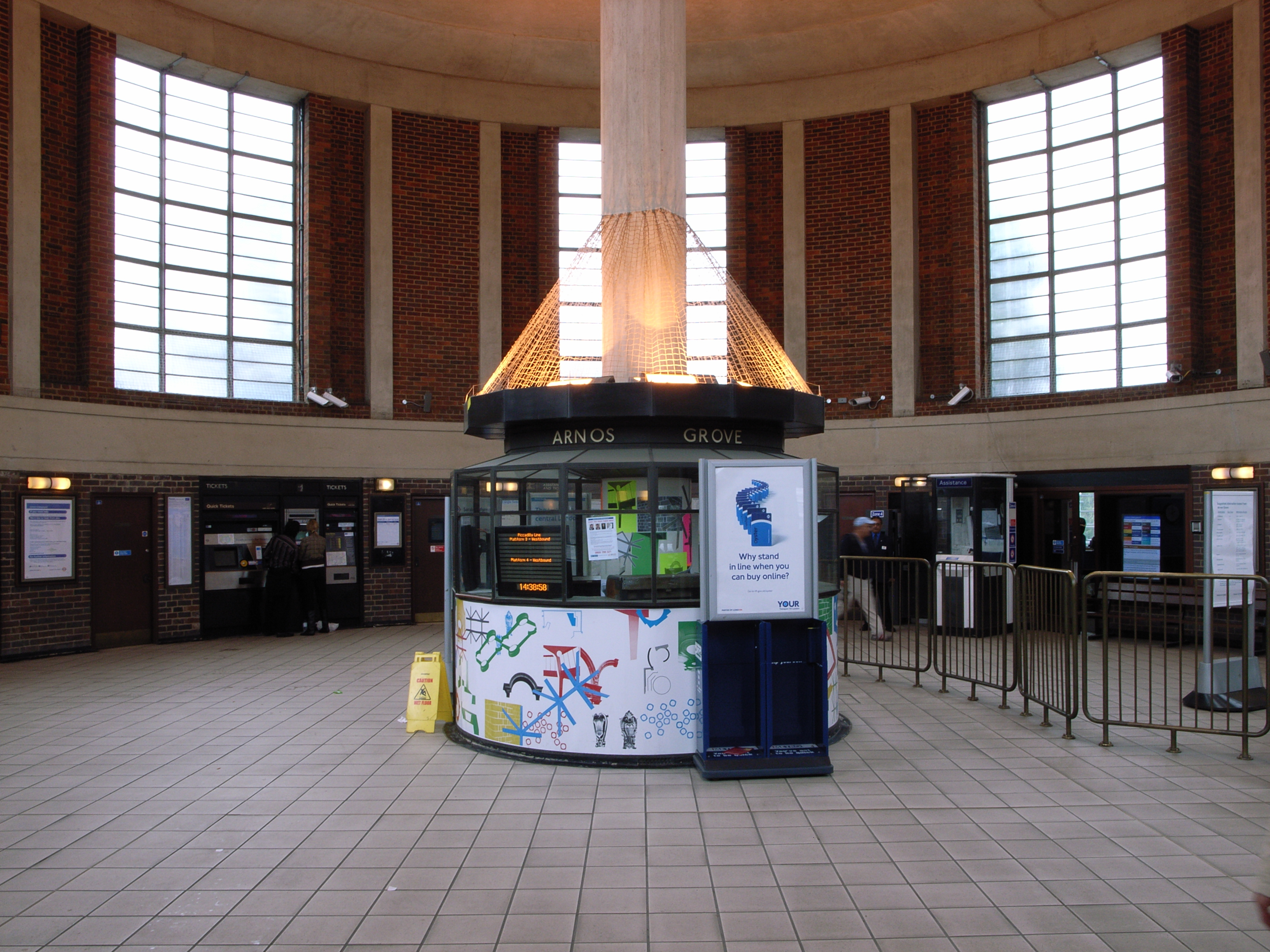
Arnos Grove with passimeter

Most of the deep level stations opened in the first phase between Finsbury Park and Hammersmith were built to a design by Leslie Green. This consisted of two-storey steel-framed buildings faced with dark oxblood red glazed terracotta blocks, with wide semi-circular windows on the upper floor. Earl's Court and Barons Court stations was built with a red brick building by Harry Wharton Ford, with semicircular windows on the second level and embedded names of the railways which operated through the station. Both station buildings are Grade II listed, and this building design at the former replaced a wooden hut building.

Extensions of the Piccadilly line towards the west and north in the 1930s had new stations designed by Charles Holden of Adams, Holden & Pearson architectural practice. These designs were inspired by modern architecture seen in a 1930 trip to several European Countries.

Several stations on the western extension originally built by the District Railway were reconstructed. The new designs used brick, concrete and glass to construct simple geometrical shapes, such as cylinders and rectangles. The first prototype station was Sudbury Town station, which has a brick cuboid box topped with a concrete slab roof for the main structure, with tall windows above the entrances. This design was replicated across many other stations. Due to the workload, some stations' designs were carried out as collaborations with the Underground's own Architect, Stanley Heaps (Boston Manor, Osterley, Ealing Common and Hounslow West), or architects from other practices (Reginald Uren for Rayner's Lane) or entirely by another practice in Holden's style (Felix Lander for Park Royal). The new stations built for the northern extension were also part of the design schemes undertaken by Holden. Southgate was distinctively different, with a round base carrying a cylindrical panel of clerestory windows, topped by an illuminated feature with a bronze ball. The ticket halls had passimeters, which functioned as free-standing ticket booths. Most of them ceased to be used when automatic ticket gates were introduced, although some have been converted for retail use. Many of these Holden-designed stations are listed buildings, Oakwood, Southgate, and Arnos Grove being among the early receivers in 1971.

Stations in Central London were modernised. Green Park received a new shelter at the southern entrance; Piccadilly Circus had its ticket hall moved below street level. Both of these changes were designed by Holden, with the latter's station ticket hall having artwork commemorating Frank Pick added in 2016. Green Park also was built with a new entrance at a corner of Devonshire House, which has Portland stone–clad steel frames. It features Graeco-Roman details, and is Grade II listed. Some stations kept their original buildings. South Ealing, where a temporary wooden station ticket hall was constructed when the line was quadrupled, was an anomaly; a modern station was not provided until the 1980s. (Note: Sources differ by year. Horne's mentioned 1989, while Wallingers' mentioned 1983.)

Green's stations such as Caledonian Road have bands of tiles arching overhead on the curved platform ceilings and above the tracks spaced 11–12 ft (3.4–3.7 m) apart. Along the platform walls, geometrical patterns of tiles were arranged in a horizontal band; varying among stations. Arc lighting was complemented with incandescent lamps to illuminate the platforms. Signage decorations, also designed by Green, present spelt out the station name in letters 15 in (38 cm) high. (Note: This decoration concept was tested and worked on Bakerloo line stations, showing uniform style yet giving each station a unique appearance.) Stations on the northern extension had particular biscuit (square) tiles on platform walls, with different frieze colours at each station. A few stations like Southgate and Bounds Green have art deco uplighters on escalators and the lower landings. Floodlighting was used considerably to provide a spacious ambience. Ventilation ducts were by the platforms walls, sealed with bronze art deco style grilles. Oakwood was built with a concrete canopy, with roof lights and cylindrical light fittings designed by Heaps.

== Infrastructure ==
=== Signalling and electricity ===
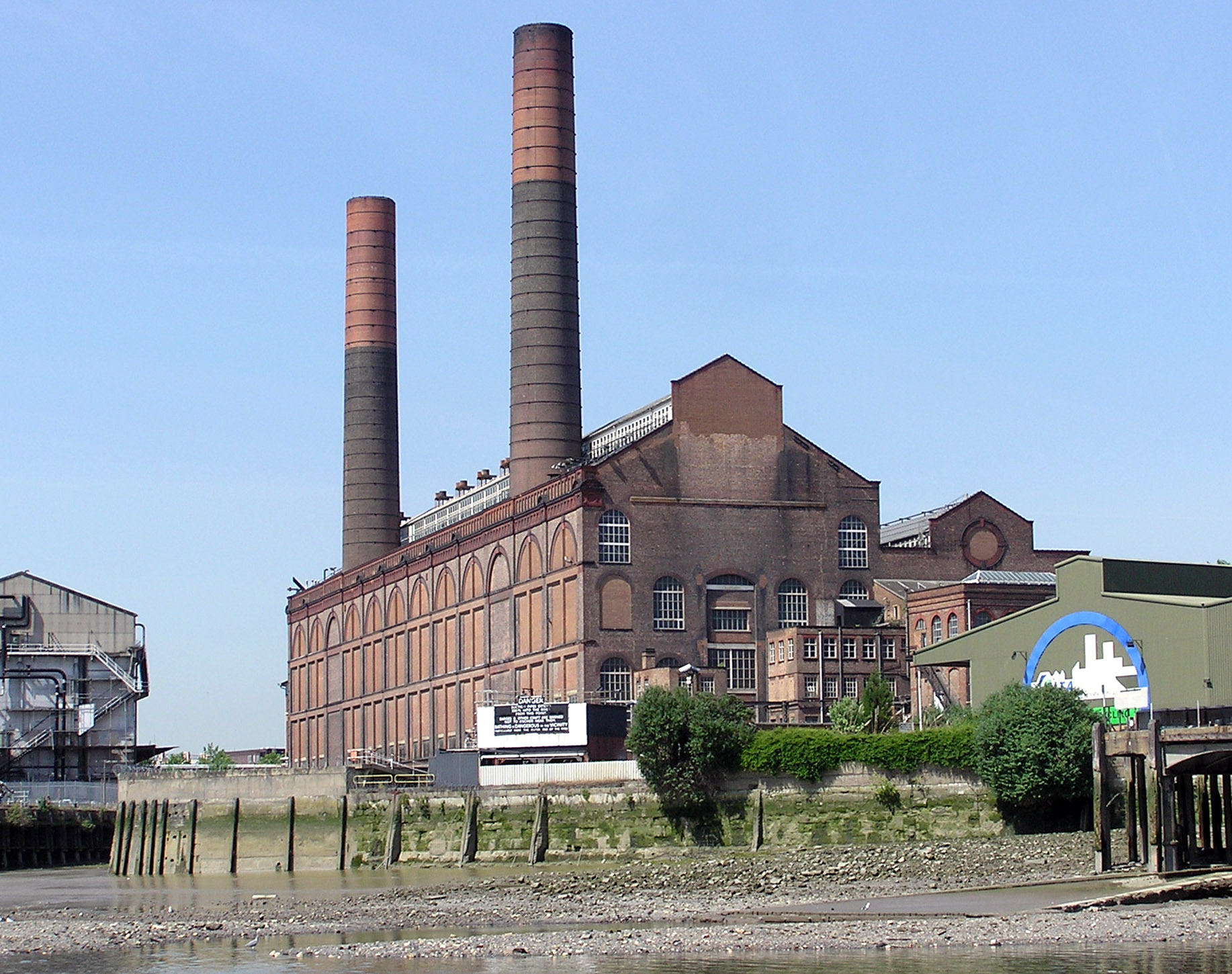
Lots Road Power Station, disused and planned to be redeveloped

The line from Cockfosters to Heathrow and South Harrow is controlled from a control centre at South Kensington, which replaced the old Earl's Court control centre, which was shared with the District line. Rayners Lane signal cabin is responsible for signalling the Piccadilly line from just northwest of South Harrow to Uxbridge, as well as the Metropolitan line joining at Rayners Lane. The signalling system is expected to be upgraded in line with the Deep Tube upgrade, which will increase line frequencies up to 33 tph. Trains may also be able to make a permanent additional stop at Turnham Green following this upgrade.

When the line was opened from Finsbury Park to Hammersmith, its signalling system was identical to the Bakerloo and District lines. Small cabins at each location of crossover installed controlled the signals there. Single lamps displayed track clearance in the form of green or red, with variations of yellow at difficult-to-spot locations. This equipment was supplied by Westinghouse and operated using compressed air. The exception was between West Kensington and Hammersmith, where it was controlled by District Railway signal boxes, and had semaphore signals instead. The Piccadilly line extensions resulted in resignalling on tracks west of Barons Court. Signal cabins were adjusted and new ones were added at Hammersmith, Acton Town and Northfields. A mixture of semaphore and colour-light signals were used on the four-track section. Signalling was redone on the new Uxbridge branch. (Note: Most of the existing semaphore signals on the District line branch to South Harrow were replaced with coloured light signals between October and December 1932.)

Speed control was introduced at several stations to enhance the signalling system after World War II. This enabled a train to proceed slowly into an occupied platform without stopping in front of another before it departed, thus improving headways. The last semaphore signal, at Ealing Common, was replaced in November 1953. A control room was built at Earl's Court to centralise supervision of most of the line signalling in the 1960s, while Rayners Lane signal cabin was, and still is, the main control centre of the Rayners Lane to Uxbridge portion; shared with the Metropolitan line. 1930s automatic signalling equipment was updated in the 1970s and 1980s.

The UERL built a large power station that would be capable of providing power for the District line and the underground lines planned. Work began in 1902 at Lots Road, by Chelsea Creek, and in February 1905 Lots Road Power Station began generating electricity at 11 kV 33 1/3 Hz, conveyed by high-voltage cables to substations that converted this to approximately 550 V DC. On the Piccadilly line, electricity was transmitted via underground ducts to Earl's Court, which was then distributed to different substations. (Note: Direct traction current was also provided from District line substations at Earl's Court and South Kensington.) Power supply for the Cockfosters extension was initially generated by the North Metropolitan Electric Power Supply Company at Wood Green. It was later supplied by Lots Road station. The National Grid network took over the supply on the Ravenscourt Park to Uxbridge and Northfields section. Lots Road was permanently closed on 31 October 2003, being also replaced by power supply from the National Grid Network. Emergency lighting, powered by batteries, is available at every station, with emergency supply from a support power station in Greenwich.

=== Depots and sidings ===
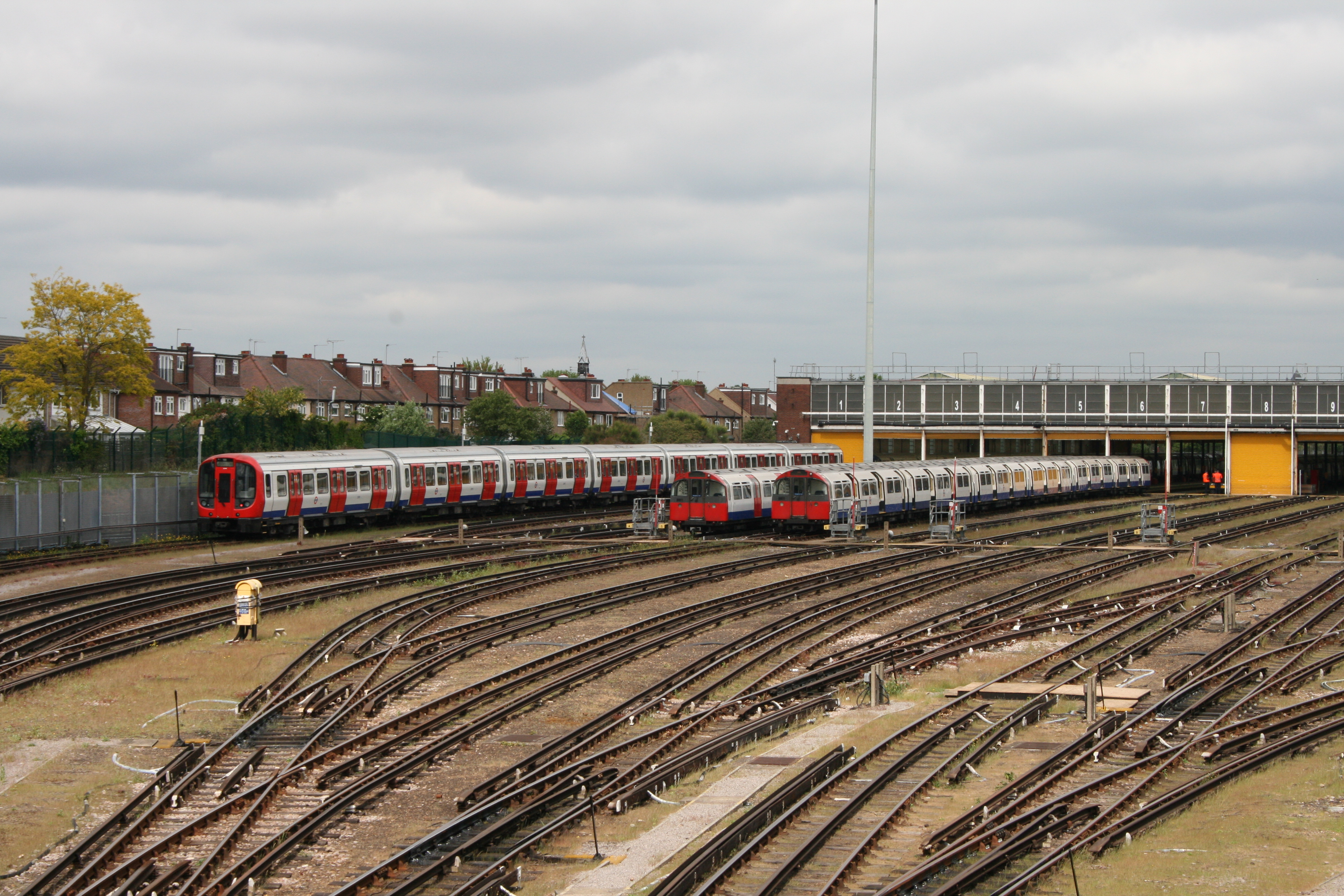
Northfields Depot, with an S stock train

The line has two depots, at Cockfosters and Northfields. The former site is near Trent Park, and was the preferred site over Oakwood, which was smaller, and its only access point was south of the station. Subsequently, Oakwood was built with an island platform, with its intended three-track terminus layout moved to Cockfosters. Light maintenance and cleaning of trains is done here, with the latter site, being the main depot, having train maintenance facilities. Northfields depot is also double-ended, with access from just west of Boston Manor station and Northfields station. For it to be built, the latter station had to be rebuilt nearer to South Ealing station. The depot was opened earlier than the Hounslow extension, on 4 July 1932, and fully electrified two months later. (Note: When opened, some District line trains were stabled here.)

Single sidings are placed at Rayners Lane, Oakwood, Down Street (Hyde Park Corner), and Wood Green. Arnos Grove, Acton Town, South Harrow, Uxbridge, Hammersmith and Heathrow Terminal 5 have more than one siding for reversing trains or storing them. Four crossovers were built for the initial line opening in 1906, Hounslow Central on 3 March 1923, and double crossovers at South Harrow were added in the 1930s.

Crossovers with other lines are present on the Piccadilly line. A connecting tunnel from the northbound Piccadilly line at King's Cross St Pancras to the northbound Northern line Bank branch was constructed in 1927. (Note: It was built to facilitate rolling stock transfers between lines and to reach Acton works.) At Finsbury Park, a set of crossovers in the south were retained where trains can cross over onto the Victoria line.

Lillie Bridge was the main depot when the Piccadilly line was initially opened. Trains entering service on the line had to reverse and enter the District line tracks first via West Kensington. When the Piccadilly and District line tracks were realigned in the 1930s, access points into the depot had to be altered. When the line was extended to Northfields and Cockfosters in 1933, all trains except seven (Note: This figure excluded trains serving the Aldwych branch which were also parked at the depot.) were stabled at the newer depot. Once the Cockfosters depot was opened, Lillie Bridge was converted to a maintenance depot, where it housed only engineers' and materials trains.

=== Station lifts and escalators ===
Most original deep-level stations were installed with lifts and stairs, with some descending directly down to platform level. Many of these were given an overhaul in the 1930s with escalators replacing lifts for quicker passenger flow. Underground stations on the Cockfosters extension were built with access mainly via escalators; each station shaft was able to fit three escalators, but some stations had two escalators with a stairwell in the middle. Escalators at Bounds Green, Wood Green and Manor House travel at 165 feet (50 m) per minute, which were then the quickest on the network. All of the original lifts were either replaced by new equipment or were converted to escalators. Alperton was the only above-ground station to have an escalator, which was transferred over from the Festival of Britain, but was decommissioned in 1988. Stations such as Green Park and King's Cross St Pancras were installed with new lifts to provide step-free access to every platform by the 2012 Summer Olympics.

== Services ==
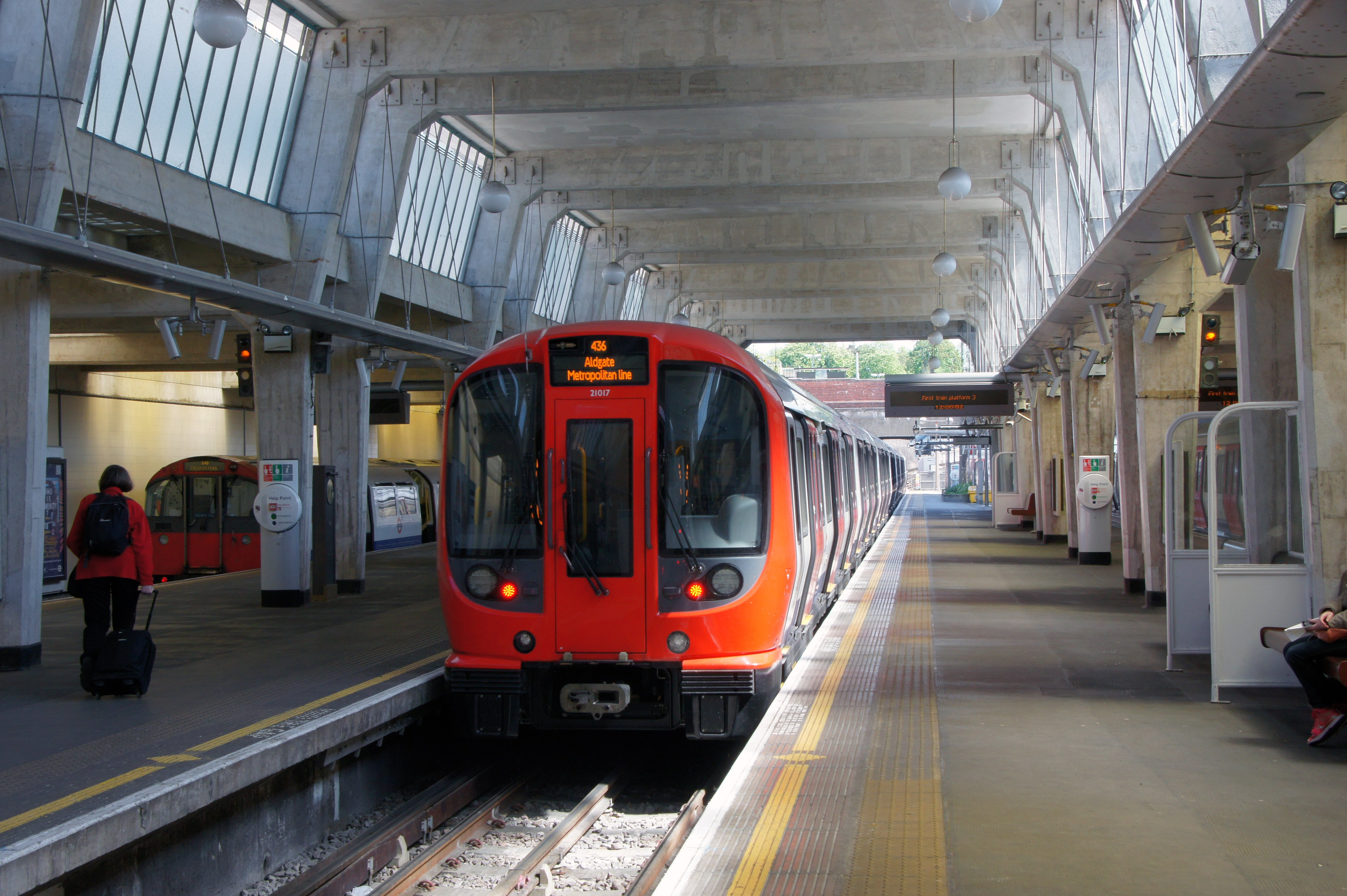
A Metropolitan line train at Uxbridge, with a Piccadilly line train to the left. This section is shared between the two lines.

Journey times on the Piccadilly line are usually around an hour and a half. Train dwell times are slightly longer at some stations, such as at Heathrow Terminals 4 and 5 stations. The former requires 8 minutes, while the latter needs 7 minutes to coordinate with the alternate Heathrow service schedule. The busiest section, as of 2016, is between King's Cross St Pancras and Russell Square. This is expected to expand, between Holloway Road and Holborn in the 2040s. The central section between Earl's Court and King's Cross St Pancras is in Fare Zone 1, to Manor House and Turnham Green in Zone 2, and to Bounds Green, Park Royal and Northfields in Zone 3; to Southgate, Sudbury Hill and Hounslow Central in Zone 4, to Cockfosters, Hatton Cross and Eastcote in Zone 5, and to Uxbridge and Heathrow Terminals in Zone 6. 79 trains are required to operate a 24 trains per hour (tph) peak-hour service on the line, while typical off-peak services are generally as follows (as of 12 January 2026):

- 6 tph Cockfosters – Heathrow Terminal 4
- 6 tph Cockfosters – Heathrow Terminal 5
- 3 tph Arnos Grove – Rayners Lane
- 3 tph Arnos Grove – Uxbridge
- 3 tph Cockfosters – Northfields

Trains also make an additional stop at Turnham Green in the early mornings and late evenings. Night Tube services have operated every 10 minutes between Cockfosters and Heathrow Terminal 5 since 16 December 2016. No Night Tube services operate to Heathrow Terminal 4 or Uxbridge.

=== Historical services ===
On 11 October 1909, peak-hour services were altered to have trains skipping certain stops to improve journey times. Trains were marked with "Non Stop", which were deemed unpopular and ambiguous among passengers. Illuminated signs were added on platforms in 1932 to address this issue. Pairs of stations were the norm, such as Holloway Road and York Road, and Caledonian Road and Gillespie Road. After World War I, Covent Garden, Russell Square, South Kensington, Brompton Road and Gloucester Road were among the stations skipped. Boston Manor, South Ealing, North Ealing and Barons Court were included into these patterns by 1938. Skip-stop services were discontinued in June 1947.

In 1930, during the planning of the northward and westward extensions, a 30tph peak-hour service was proposed between Wood Green and Turnham Green. This was preferred over an alternate skip-stop service through Bounds Green. (Note: Several stations were planned to be closed to improve running times, and Bounds Green would not have been included as a station.) When the Piccadilly line was initially extended to Northfields in 1933, South Ealing was skipped. It was eventually served on 29 April 1935 by off-peak trains, and peak services in May 1942.

When the Piccadilly line shared its storage of trains with the District line at Lillie Bridge Depot, some trains started and ended their service at West Kensington; a few of these ran empty between West Kensington and Hammersmith. These services ceased on 27 October 1991.

During disruptions, Piccadilly line trains were able to run on the “local” District line tracks, stopping at all stations between Acton Town and Hammersmith. The crossover points at Hammersmith were decommissioned and subsequently removed in the early-2020s meaning that this is no longer possible.

== Rolling stock ==
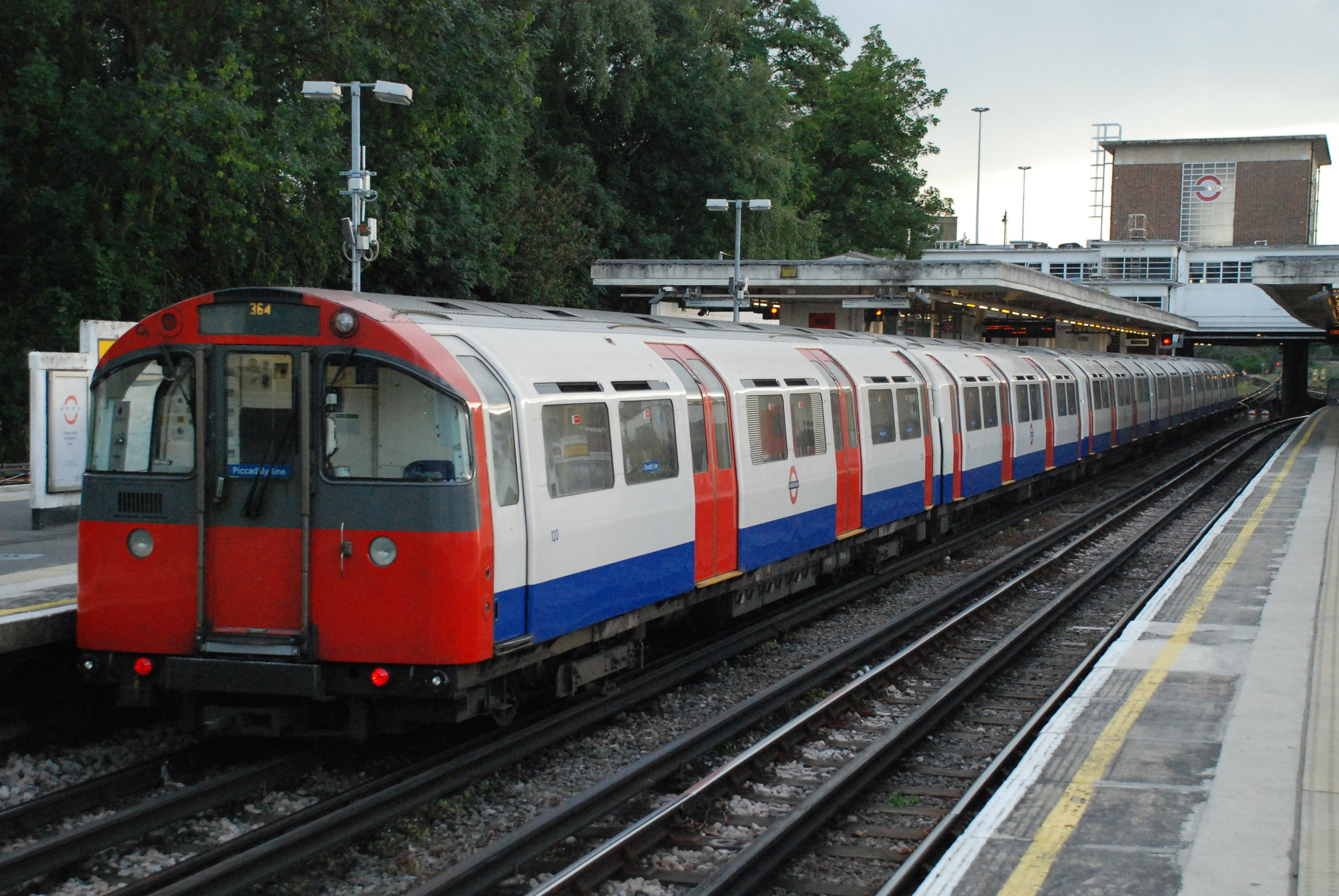
1973 stock at Northfields

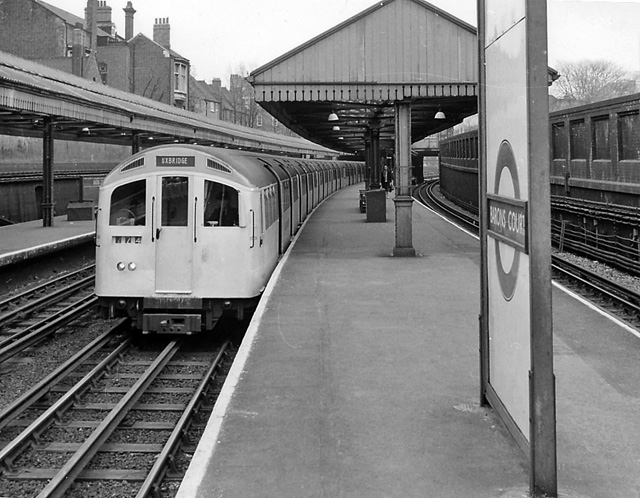
1959 Stock train at Barons Court

The 352 ft (107.2 m) six-car 1973 tube stocks provide services on the Piccadilly line, which were built between 1974 and 1977 by Metro-Cammell. These trains were built 6 ft (1.8 m) longer than the 1959 stock trains to accommodate more luggage space and speed up journey times with more comfort. As of 2020, their livery is of standard London Underground corporate of blue, white and red. They were previously unpainted, exposing the aluminium alloy material. Traction voltage is at 630 V DC current powered by the third and fourth rail. The first of these trains entered service on 18 August 1975. (Note: One train was used during the Hatton Cross extension opening on 19 July that same year.) They were refurbished by Bombardier from 1995 to 2000 in Wakefield, Yorkshire. Changes included the removal of transverse seating, strap hangers replaced with grab bars, new floor material and a full repaint into London Underground's corporate livery. A refurbished carriage on one train was first seen in service on 20 January 1991 to test the new interior concept. (Note: The shared section between Rayners Lane and Uxbridge is also served by S8 stock trains on the Metropolitan line. Between Hammersmith and Acton Town, it is parallel to the District line, which is served by S7 stock trains.)

=== Future rolling stock ===
In the late 1990s, the Labour government initiated a public–private partnership (PPP) to reverse years of underinvestment in London Underground. Tube Lines planned to order 93 new Piccadilly line trains, which would enter service by 2014. In January 2007, Tube Lines started the process of ordering new Piccadilly line trains, by querying if train manufacturers would be interested in supplying them. Contract award was anticipated for 2008, and trains would enter service on the Piccadilly line in 2014. However, TfL bought out the Tube Lines consortium after cost overruns in 2010, formally ending the PPP.

In the mid 2010s, TfL began a process of ordering new rolling stock to replace trains on the Piccadilly, Central, Bakerloo and Waterloo & City lines. A feasibility study into the new trains showed that new generation trains and re-signalling could increase capacity on the Piccadilly line by 60%, with 36 trains per hour.

In June 2018, the Siemens Inspiro was selected. These trains will have an open gangway design, wider doorways, air conditioning and the ability to run automatically with a new signalling system. However, TfL could only afford to order 94 trains at a cost of £1.5bn, and not the cost of resignalling and automating the line. Siemens confirmed 80% of the new trains will be built in Siemens Goole, East Riding of Yorkshire.

Trains were initially expected to enter service at the end of 2025 but were delayed to between July and December 2026 due to some engineering complexities.

Trains had been undergoing high-speed testing at a depot in Germany before being delivered to TfL. In late July 2025 the first train started testing on the line. On 2 and 3 August, it started mainline testing between Northfields and Hyde Park Corner.

In February 2026, operational deployment of the new trains was postponed for a further 10–17 months, and the project's cost was announced to have increased by £409 million to £3.4 billion.

=== Historical tube stocks ===
The line was previously worked by the 1906 gate stock, which were manufactured in France and Hungary. The 52 ft (16 m) carriages were connected to form three, four or five-car trains, and were designed to have a maximum of six cars per train. Built with steel as its main material, the interiors were covered by fireproof mahogany veneer. Six-car trains were implemented in 1917. Additional cars were ordered and brought into service between 1920 and 1921 to combat shortage of capacity. In late 1920s, plans were developed to replace these outdated stocks. Metropolitan Carriage, Wagon & Finance Company (Metro-Cammell's predecessor) was to build standard tube stocks, which were delivered within 1928 and 1929. Another batch of these were constructed in Feltham by the Union Construction company. All the gate stocks were decommissioned in June 1929. The new standard tube stocks have some wider doors on trailer cars and extra doors on the motor car. All doors are now air-operated. (Note: The 1906 gate stock was still in use on the Aldwych shuttle.) In 1929, it was suggested that a new prototype of tube stock should include three double doors on each side. These seven-car trains, also standard tube stocks, had carriages at least one foot longer. They were made to be lighter, and had better interior lighting. These new trains were completed in two periods, 1931 and 1934, which costed £1.20 million in total.

Due to ridership increasing by 61 per cent on the Uxbridge branch between 1931 and 1938, Piccadilly line trains were packed with passengers. New experimental trains were brought into service in 1936, which were formed of four or six cars. These trains had their control equipment (of seven different types from four different manufacturers) placed under the car floor, which enabled more space for passengers on both motor cars. While boarding times were decreased, some of the designs of control equipment were said to be less reliable than others. Nevertheless, they were a prototype for the design of the 1938 stock. As a safety measure for World War II, trains initially had their lights switched off at night. It was later amended to illuminate trains with dim blue lamps, and then, largely enclosed reading lamps. Patronage on the line increased greatly after the war, which meant additional trains were needed. New 1938 stocks, together with the experimental trains were rebuilt to form a fleet of seven-car 1949 stock trains, in operation from 1952. (Note: Meanwhile, 1906 stock trains were withdrawn on the Aldwych branch in December 1956, being replaced by two experimental trains. One train was transferred to the Epping — Ongar shuttle in 1957.)

New test trains were manufactured again in the 1950s. Three prototype trains, branded as the 1956 stock, were trialled on the Piccadilly line in 1957 and 1958. These new trains would replace most of the Standard stock. It was successful, and 76 seven-car trains were placed on order as the 1959 stock. These were built by Metro-Cammell, with the first train entering service on 14 December 1959. (Note: The Central line had problems with the wearing old standard stock, which were in urgent need of replacement. Combined with electrification of British Rail lines which forecasted new journeys on the line, priority was given to use some of the 1959 stock before the 1962 stock was produced. Once the latter stocks were fully in service in May 1964, the 57 trains were transferred back onto the Piccadilly line. Previously, the line already had 19 1959 stock trains in service. A three-car 1962 stock train was brought into service on the Aldwych shuttle to replace the experimental train.) The standard stocks were withdrawn by 1964, and the 1938 stocks were slowly taken out of service due to age. The 1959 stocks were gradually transferred to the Northern line between November 1975 and October 1979, being replaced by the 1973 stock trains; the last of the latter coming into service on 5 October 1979.

A few 1938 trains were preserved, and in June 2011, one of these trains made a few shuttle trips on the line as part of an event in conjunction with Father's Day.

== List of stations ==
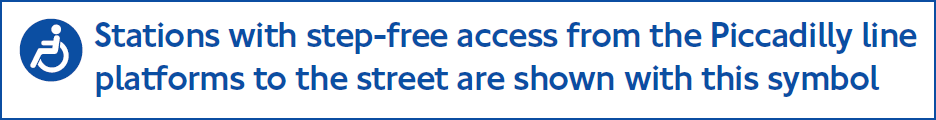
Notice found inside all Piccadilly line trains explaining step-free access

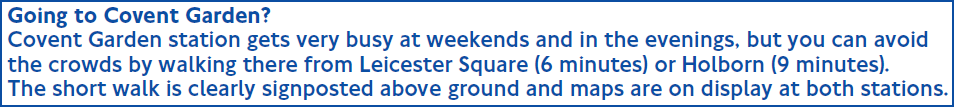
Notice found inside all Piccadilly line trains explaining alternative routes to Covent Garden

=== Open stations ===
==== Main route ====
| Station | Image | Opened | Additional information |
|---|---|---|---|
| Cockfosters | | 31 July 1933 | Terminus ^{map 1} |
| Oakwood | | 13 March 1933 | Opened as Enfield West, (East Barnet was initially proposed, name was changed before opening) it was renamed Enfield West (Oakwood) on 3 May 1934. It was renamed to its present name on 1 September 1946. ^{map 2} |
| Southgate | | 13 March 1933 | ^{map 3} |
| Arnos Grove | | 19 September 1932 | ^{map 4} |
Tunnel section starts
| Bounds Green | | 19 September 1932 | ^{map 5} |
| Wood Green | | 19 September 1932 | ^{map 6} |
| Turnpike Lane | | 19 September 1932 | ^{map 7} |
| Manor House | | 19 September 1932 | ^{map 8} |
| Finsbury Park | | 1 July 1861 | Piccadilly line platforms opened on 15 December 1906. Cross-platform interchange with Victoria line, interchange with National Rail services.^{map 9} |
| Arsenal | | 15 December 1906 | Opened as Gillespie Road; renamed Arsenal (Highbury Hill) 31 October 1932; the suffix was later dropped in 1960.^{map 10} |
| Holloway Road | | 15 December 1906 | ^{map 11} |
| Caledonian Road | | 15 December 1906 | ^{map 12} |
| King's Cross St Pancras | | 10 January 1863 | Opened as "King's Cross", it was renamed "King's Cross for St. Pancras" in 1927. The station was renamed again in 1933 to its present name. The Piccadilly line platforms opened on 15 December 1906. Interchange with Circle, Hammersmith & City, Metropolitan, Northern and Victoria lines, National Rail services and Eurostar.^{map 13} |
| Russell Square | | 15 December 1906 | ^{map 14} |
| Holborn | | 15 December 1906 | Opened as Holborn (Kingsway), suffix gradually dropped until 1960. Interchange with Central line.^{map 15} |
| Covent Garden | | 11 April 1907 | ^{map 16} |
| Leicester Square | | 15 December 1906 | Interchange with Northern line.^{map 17} |
| Piccadilly Circus | | 10 March 1906 | Interchange with Bakerloo line. ^{map 18} |
| Green Park | | 15 December 1906 | Opened as Dover Street; renamed 18 September 1933. Interchange with Jubilee and Victoria lines.^{map 19} |
| Hyde Park Corner | | 15 December 1906 | ^{map 20} |
| Knightsbridge | | 15 December 1906 | ^{map 21} |
| South Kensington | | 1 October 1868 | Piccadilly line services began on 8 January 1907; interchange with Circle and District lines.^{map 22} |
| Gloucester Road | | 1 October 1868 | Piccadilly line services began on 15 December 1906; interchange with Circle and District lines.^{map 23} |
| Earl's Court | | 30 October 1871 | Piccadilly line services began on 15 December 1906; interchange with District line.^{map 24} |
Tunnel section ends
| Barons Court | | 9 October 1905 | Piccadilly line services began on 15 December 1906; cross-platform interchange with District line. ^{map 25} |
| Hammersmith | | 9 September 1874 | Piccadilly line services began on 15 December 1906; cross-platform interchange with District line, interchange with Circle and Hammersmith & City lines from a different station of the same name.^{map 26} |
| Turnham Green | | 1 January 1869 | First served by the Piccadilly line on 23 June 1963; interchange with District line. Trains only call here early in the morning and after 22:30 each evening. ^{map 27} |
| Acton Town | | 1 July 1879 | Opened as Mill Hill Park, renamed on 1 October 1910. Piccadilly line services began on 4 July 1932; cross-platform interchange with District line. ^{map 28} |

==== Heathrow branch ====
Continuing from Acton Town
| Station | Image | Opened | Piccadilly line service began | Additional information |
| South Ealing | | 1 May 1883 | 29 April 1935 | Off-peak Piccadilly line services began on 29 April 1935, while peak services came in May 1942. ^{map 29} |
| Northfields | | 16 April 1908 | 9 January 1933 | Opened as Northfield (Ealing), renamed Northfields & Little Ealing on 11 December 1911. The station was relocated to the east on 19 May 1932, enabling a depot to be constructed west of the new location. ^{map 30} |
| Boston Manor | | 1 May 1883 | 13 March 1933 | Opened as Boston Road, renamed 11 December 1911 ^{map 31} |
| Osterley | | 25 March 1934 | | Replacement of Osterley & Spring Grove station ^{map 32} |
| Hounslow East | | 2 May 1909 | 13 March 1933 | Opened as Hounslow Town, renamed 1 December 1925 ^{map 33} |
| Hounslow Central | | 1 April 1886 | 13 March 1933 | Opened as Heston–Hounslow, renamed 1 December 1925 ^{map 34} |
Start of tunnel section
| Hounslow West | | 21 July 1884 | 13 March 1933 | Opened as Hounslow Barracks, renamed 1 December 1925. Resited 19 July 1975 ^{map 35} |
| Hatton Cross | | 19 July 1975 | | ^{map 36} |
| Heathrow Terminal 4 (not connected to tube station) | | 12 April 1986 | | ^{map 37} |
| Heathrow Terminals 2 & 3 (not connected to tube station) | | 16 December 1977 | | Opened as Heathrow Central; renamed Heathrow Terminals 1, 2, 3 on 12 April 1986; renamed Heathrow Terminals 2 & 3 in January 2016; ^{map 38} |
| Heathrow Terminal 5 | | 27 March 2008 | | Terminus ^{map 39} |
Train services alternate between Terminals 2,3 & 5 and Terminals 4 & 2,3 since 2008.

==== Uxbridge branch ====
Continuing from Acton Town
| Station | Image | Opened | Piccadilly line service began | Additional information |
| Ealing Common | | 1 July 1879 | 4 July 1932 | Shared platforms with District line. ^{map 40} |
| North Ealing | | 23 June 1903 | 4 July 1932 | ^{map 41} |
| Park Royal | | 6 July 1931 | 4 July 1932 | Replacement of Park Royal & Twyford Abbey station; renamed Park Royal (Hanger Hill) 1 March 1936; reverted to original in 1947 ^{map 42} |
| Alperton | | 28 June 1903 | 4 July 1932 | Opened as Perivale–Alperton by the District line; renamed 7 October 1910 ^{map 43} |
| Sudbury Town | | 28 June 1903 | 4 July 1932 | ^{map 44} |
| Sudbury Hill ( Sudbury Hill Harrow) | | 28 June 1903 | 4 July 1932 | ^{map 45} |
| South Harrow | | 28 June 1903 | 4 July 1932 | Platforms moved approximately 200 feet (61 m) to the west in 1935 ^{map 46} |
Shared section with Metropolitan line
| Rayners Lane | | 26 May 1906 | 23 October 1933 | ^{map 47} |
| Eastcote | | 26 May 1906 | 23 October 1933 | ^{map 48} |
| Ruislip Manor | | 5 August 1912 | 23 October 1933 | ^{map 49} |
| Ruislip | | 4 July 1904 | 23 October 1933 | ^{map 50} |
| Ickenham | | 25 September 1905 | 23 October 1933 | ^{map 51} |
| Hillingdon | | 10 December 1923 | 23 October 1933 | The station was named Hillingdon (Swakeleys) from the 1930s to the 1950s. It was relocated in 1992 to make way for the A40 expansion. ^{map 52} |
| Uxbridge | | 4 July 1904 | 23 October 1933 | Terminus; relocated 4 December 1938 ^{map 53} |

=== Closed stations ===
The Aldwych branch

- Aldwych opened on 30 November 1907 as Strand. It was renamed Aldwych on 9 May 1915. The possibility of extending the branch to Waterloo was discussed, but the scheme never proceeded. Aldwych was closed on 30 September 1994. It is now regularly used by film makers, and London Transport Museum regularly hosts guided tours of the station via its Hidden London programme.
- Brompton Road opened 15 December 1906; closed 30 July 1934, between Knightsbridge and South Kensington.
- Down Street opened 15 December 1906; closed 21 May 1932, between Green Park and Hyde Park Corner. During the Second World War, it was covertly transformed into the Railway Executive Committee's bomb-proof headquarters. Today, London Transport Museum hosts guided tours of the station via its Hidden London programme.
- Osterley & Spring Grove first served on 13 March 1933; closed 24 March 1934, between Boston Manor and Hounslow East. It was replaced by Osterley.
- Park Royal & Twyford Abbey opened 23 June 1903; closed 5 July 1931. Although on the route of the current Piccadilly line, a short distance north of the present Park Royal station, it was never served by Piccadilly line trains. It was opened by the District Railway, and was closed and replaced by Park Royal before the Piccadilly line started running trains to South Harrow in 1932.
- York Road opened 15 December 1906; closed 19 September 1932, between King's Cross St Pancras and Caledonian Road. It was about 600 m north of King's Cross St Pancras.

== Future upgrade and proposals ==
The Piccadilly line is to be upgraded under the New Tube for London scheme, involving new trains as well as new signalling, increasing the line's capacity by some 24 per cent and reducing journey times by one fifth. Bids for new rolling stock were originally submitted in 2008. However, after the acquisition of Tube Lines by Transport for London in June 2010, this order was cancelled and the upgrade postponed.

LUL then invited Alstom, Bombardier and Siemens Mobility to develop a new concept of lightweight, low-energy, semi-articulated train for the deep-level lines, provisionally called "Evo" (for 'evolution'). Siemens publicised an outline design featuring air-conditioning and battery power to enable the train to run on to the next station if third and fourth rail power were lost. It would have a lower floor and 11 per cent higher passenger capacity than the present tube stock. There would be a weight saving of 30 tonnes, and the trains would be 17 per cent more energy-efficient with air-conditioning included, or 30 per cent more energy-efficient without it. Siemens Mobility was awarded a £1.5 billion contract in June 2018 to produce the new trains at a planned factory in Goole, East Yorkshire.

The intention is for the new trains to eventually operate on the Bakerloo, Central, Piccadilly and Waterloo & City lines. Resignalling work on the Piccadilly line was to begin in 2019 but this has since been shelved because of lack of funds. New trains were due to enter service in 2023, bringing an increase in peak frequencies from 24 to 27 tph. In March 2021, it was reported that the new trains would not enter service before 2025, that the increase in peak frequency from 24 to 27 tph would not take place until about 2027, and that any further increase to 30 tph would be delayed until the signalling system is upgraded, for which funds are not currently available. In June 2025, TfL reported that they had faced difficulties when testing for the new trains and the date for introduction would delay to at least the second half of 2026.

There have previously been some proposals, predominantly by Slough Borough Council, to extend the line towards Slough railway station from Heathrow Terminal 5 station. A number of routes have been proposed, and the main ones pass very close to but do not call at Windsor. The current thinking, and most viable options are to support a western access link diverging from the Great Western Main Line just east of Langley station.

In 2005, a business case was prepared to re-open the disused York Road station, to serve the King's Cross Central development and help relieve congestion at King's Cross St Pancras.

== See also ==
- Fourth rail

== Geographical locations ==
- ^map 1Cockfosters – 51°39′06″N 000°08′56″W
- ^map 2Oakwood – 51°38′51″N 000°07′54″W
- ^map 3Southgate – 51°37′57″N 000°07′41″W
- ^map 4Arnos Grove – 51°36′59″N 000°08′01″W
- ^map 5Bounds Green – 51°36′25″N 000°07′27″W
- ^map 6Wood Green – 51°35′49″N 000°06′36″W
- ^map 7Turnpike Lane – 51°35′25″N 000°06′10″W
- ^map 8Manor House – 51°34′15″N 000°05′46″W
- ^map 9Finsbury Park – 51°33′53″N 000°06′23″W
- ^map 10Arsenal – 51°33′31″N 000°06′21″W
- ^map 11Holloway Road – 51°33′11″N 000°06′43″W
- ^map 12Caledonian Road – 51°32′54″N 000°07′07″W
- ^map 13King's Cross St Pancras – 51°31′49″N 000°07′27″W
- ^map 14Russell Square – 51°31′23″N 000°07′28″W
- ^map 15Holborn – 51°31′03″N 000°07′12″W
- ^map 16Covent Garden – 51°30′47″N 000°07′27″W
- ^map 17Leicester Square – 51°30′41″N 000°07′41″W
- ^map 18Piccadilly Circus – 51°30′36″N 000°08′02″W
- ^map 19Green Park – 51°30′24″N 000°08′34″W
- ^map 20Hyde Park Corner – 51°30′10″N 000°09′10″W
- ^map 21Knightsbridge – 51°30′06″N 000°09′39″W
- ^map 22South Kensington – 51°29′39″N 000°10′26″W
- ^map 23Gloucester Road – 51°29′41″N 000°10′59″W
- ^map 24Earl's Court – 51°29′29″N 000°11′41″W
- ^map 25Barons Court – 51°29′26″N 000°12′49″W
- ^map 26Hammersmith – 51°29′39″N 000°13′30″W
- ^map 27Turnham Green – 51°29′43″N 000°15′18″W
- ^map 28Acton Town – 51°30′10″N 000°16′48″W
- ^map 29South Ealing – 51°30′04″N 000°18′26″W
- ^map 30Northfields – 51°29′58″N 000°18′51″W
- ^map 31Boston Manor – 51°29′45″N 000°19′30″W
- ^map 32Osterley – 51°28′53″N 000°21′08″W
- ^map 33Hounslow East – 51°28′23″N 000°21′23″W
- ^map 34Hounslow Central – 51°28′17″N 000°21′59″W
- ^map 35Hounslow West – 51°28′25″N 000°23′08″W
- ^map 36Hatton Cross – 51°28′01″N 000°25′24″W
- ^map 37Heathrow Terminal 4 – 51°27′32″N 000°26′46″W
- ^map 38Heathrow Terminals 2 & 3 – 51°28′16″N 000°27′07″W
- ^map 39Heathrow Terminal 5 – 51°28′20″N 000°29′17″W
- ^map 40Ealing Common – 51°30′37″N 000°17′17″W
- ^map 41North Ealing – 51°31′03″N 000°17′19″W
- ^map 42Park Royal – 51°31′37″N 000°17′03″W
- ^map 43Alperton – 51°32′27″N 000°17′59″W
- ^map 44Sudbury Town – 51°33′03″N 000°18′56″W
- ^map 45Sudbury Hill – 51°33′25″N 000°20′11″W
- ^map 46South Harrow – 51°33′53″N 000°21′08″W
- ^map 47Rayners Lane – 51°34′31″N 000°22′17″W
- ^map 48Eastcote – 51°34′36″N 000°23′49″W
- ^map 49Ruislip Manor – 51°34′24″N 000°24′45″W
- ^map 50Ruislip – 51°34′17″N 000°25′16″W
- ^map 51Ickenham – 51°33′43″N 000°26′31″W
- ^map 52Hillingdon – 51°33′14″N 000°27′00″W
- ^map 53Uxbridge – 51°32′45″N 000°28′42″W
- ^map 54Cockfosters Depot – 51°38′56″N 000°08′25″W
- ^map 55Northfields Depot – 51°29′50″N 000°19′14″W

== Notes and references ==
=== Bibliography ===
- Barker, T. C.; Robbins, Michael (1974). A History of London Transport: Volume two – the Twentieth Century to 1970. London: George Allen & Unwin Ltd. ISBN 0-04-385067-7.
- Badsey-Ellis, Antony (2005). London's Lost Tube Schemes. Capital Transport. ISBN 1-85414-293-3.
- Badsey-Ellis, Antony (2016). Building London's Underground: From Cut-and Cover to Crossrail. Capital Transport. ISBN 978-1-8541-4397-6.
- Bruce, J. Graeme (1988). The London Underground Tube Stock. Shepperton: Ian Allan and London Transport Museum. ISBN 978-0-7110-1707-8.
- Butt, R. V. J. (October 1995). The Directory of Railway Stations: details every public and private passenger station, halt, platform and stopping place, past and present (1st ed.). Sparkford: Patrick Stephens Ltd. ISBN 978-1-85260-508-7. OCLC 60251199. OL 11956311M.
- Cherry, Bridget; Pevsner, Nikolaus (1991). London 3: North West. The Buildings of England. Yale University Press. ISBN 978-0-300-09652-1.
- Connor, J. E. (2001) [1999]. London's Disused Underground Stations. Capital Transport. ISBN 1-85414-250-X.
- Connor, J. E. (2006) [1999]. London's Disused Underground Stations (2nd (revised) ed.). Capital Transport. ISBN 978-1-85414-250-4.
- Croome, Desmond F. (1998). The Piccadilly Line – An Illustrated History. London: Capital Transport Publishing. ISBN 1-85414-192-9.
- Croome, Desmond F.; Jackson, Alan Arthur (1993). Rails Through the Clay: A History of London's Tube Railways. Capital Transport. ISBN 978-1-85414-151-4.
- Day, John R.; Reed, John (2008) [1963]. The Story of London's Underground (10th ed.). Capital Transport. ISBN 978-1-85414-316-7.
- Day, John R; Reed, John (2010) [1963]. The Story of London's Underground (11th ed.). Capital Transport. ISBN 978-1-85414-341-9.
- Follenfant, H. G. (1974). Reconstructing London's Underground. London Transport Executive. ISBN 978-0-85329-039-1.
- Hardy, Brian (2001). Underground Train File: Tube Stock 1933-1959. Harrow Weald: Capital Transport. ISBN 1-85414-235-6.
- Harris, Cyril M. (2006) [1977]. What's in a name?. Capital Transport. ISBN 1-85414-241-0.
- Horne, Mike (2000). The Jubilee Line. Capital Transport. ISBN 978-1-85414-220-7.
- Horne, Mike (2003). The Metropolitan Line. Capital Transport. ISBN 1-85414-275-5.
- Horne, Mike (2006). The District Line: An Illustrated History. Capital Transport. ISBN 1-85414-292-5.
- Horne, Mike (2007). The Piccadilly Tube – A History of the First Hundred Years. London: Capital Transport. ISBN 978-1-85414-305-1.
- Karol, Eitan (2007). Charles Holden: Architect. Shaun Tyas. ISBN 978-1-900289-81-8.
- Klapper, Charles (1976). London's lost railways. London: Routledge & Kegan Paul. ISBN 9780710083784. OCLC 487714609.
- Lee, Charles E. (1966). Sixty Years of the Piccadilly. London: London Transport.
- Lee, Charles E. (1973). The Piccadilly Line: a brief history. London: London Transport. ISBN 0-85329-042-3.
- Martin, Andrew (2012). Underground, Overground: A Passenger's History of the Tube. Profile Books. ISBN 978-1-84765-807-4.
- Powers, Alan (2007). "Holden, Charles (Henry)". Grove Art Online. Oxford University Press. (Wikipedia Library ID accepted)
- Rose, Douglas (1999). The London Underground, A Diagrammatic History. Douglas Rose/Capital Transport. ISBN 1-85414-219-4.
- Rose, Douglas (December 2007) [1980]. The London Underground: A Diagrammatic History (8th ed.). Harrow Weald: Capital Transport. ISBN 978-1-85414-315-0.
- Simpson, Bill (2003). A History of the Metropolitan Railway. Volume 1: The Circle and Extended Lines to Rickmansworth. Lamplight Publications. ISBN 1-899246-07-X.
- Wallinger, Mark; Self, Will; Warner, Marina; Wolmar, Christian; Bal, Thierry; Coysh, Louise; Dillon, Tamsin (6 October 2014). Labyrinth: A Journey Through London's Underground by Mark Wallinger. Art / Books. ISBN 978-1-90897-016-9.
- Wolmar, Christian (2005) [2004]. The Subterranean Railway: How the London Underground Was Built and How It Changed the City Forever. Atlantic Books. ISBN 1-84354-023-1.
- The Victoria Line : Report by the London Travel Committee to the Minister of Transport and Civil Aviation. Her Majesty's Stationery Office. 1959.
