= Cockfosters tube station =

London Underground station

Cockfosters
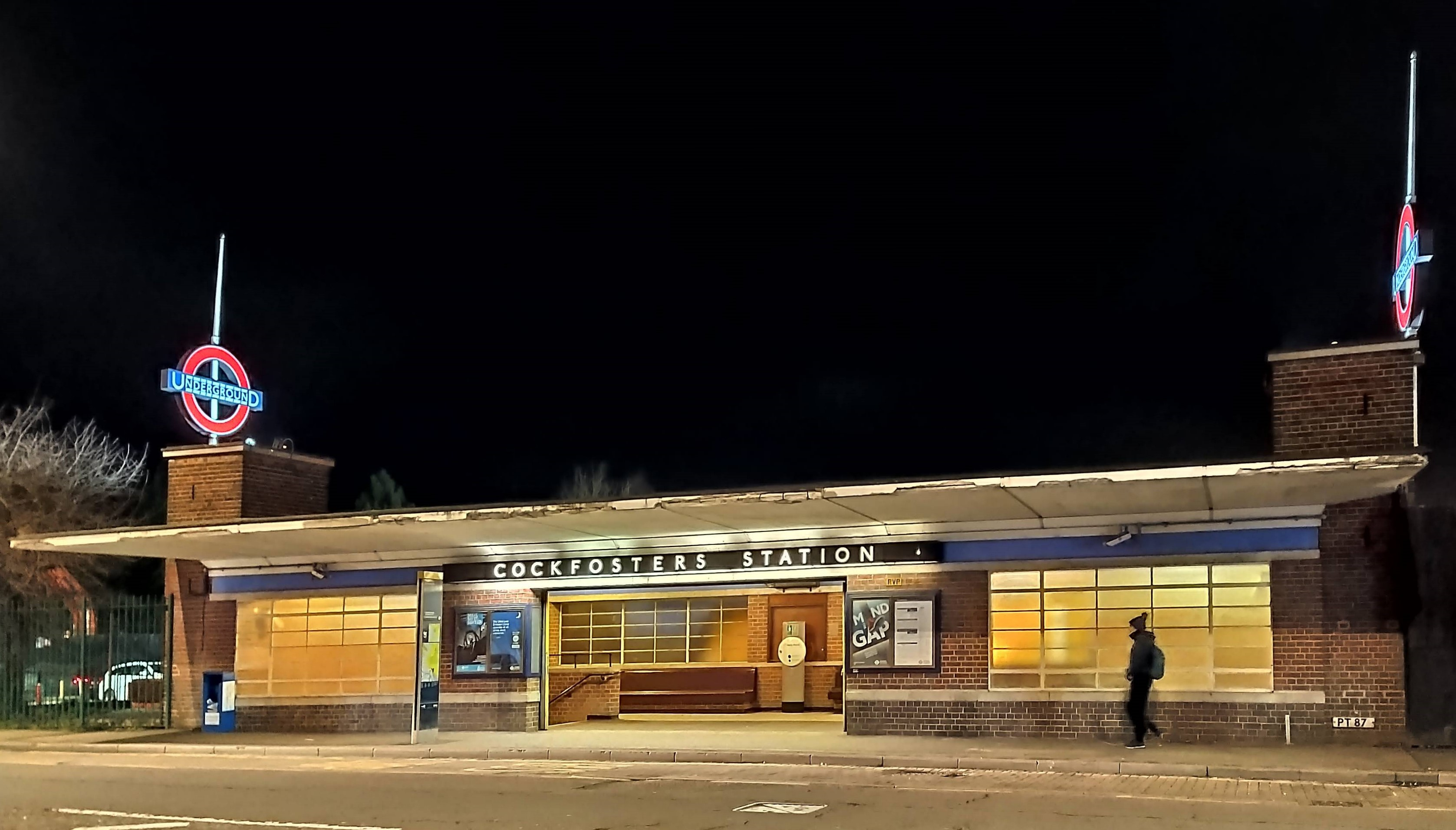
- Station entrance
- Interactive map of Cockfosters

General information
- Location: Cockfosters
- Local authority: London Borough of Enfield/London Borough of Barnet
- Managed by: London Underground
- Number of platforms: 4
- Tracks: 3
- Accessible: Yes
- Fare zone: 5

London Underground annual entry and exit
- 2021: ▼0.84 million
- 2022: ▲1.41 million
- 2023: ▲1.45 million
- 2024: ▼1.41 million
- 2025: ▲1.42 million

Key dates
- 31 July 1933: Opened (Piccadilly line)

Listed status
- Listing grade: II
- Entry number: 1358718
- Added to list: 26 May 1987

Other information
- External links: TfL station info page
- Coordinates: 51.6516°N 0.1488°W

Cockfosters (/ˈkɒkˌfɒstərz/) is a London Underground station. It is located on Cockfosters Road (A111), which is approximately nine miles (14 km) from central London and serves Cockfosters. The station is at the boundary of the London Borough of Barnet and the London Borough of Enfield. It is the eastern terminus of the Piccadilly line and the next station towards west is Oakwood. The station is in London fare zone 5.

== History ==
The station opened on 31 July 1933, the last of the stations on the extension of the line from Finsbury Park to do so and four months after Oakwood station (then called Enfield West) opened. Prior to its opening, Trent Park and Cock Fosters (an early spelling of the area's name) were suggested as alternative station names. The original site hoarding displayed the name as a single word.

The station was designed by Charles Holden in a modern European style using brick, glass and reinforced concrete. Compared with the other new stations Holden designed for the extension, Cockfosters' street buildings are modest in scale, lacking the mass of Oakwood or Arnos Grove or the avant-garde flourish of Southgate. Holden's early design sketches show the station with two towers. The most striking feature of the station is the tall concrete and glass trainshed roof and platform canopies, which are supported by portal frames of narrow blade-like concrete columns and beams rising from the platforms and spanning across the tracks. The trainshed roof constructed at Uxbridge from 1937 to 1938 was built to a similar design. Cockfosters station is a Grade II listed building.

The station has three tracks with platforms numbered 1 to 4, the centre track being served from both sides by platforms 2 and 3. This is an example of the so-called Spanish solution. Most eastbound Piccadilly trains terminate here, although some terminate at Arnos Grove or Oakwood, particularly in peak hours or in the evenings. Some trains may even terminate at Wood Green; however, this is only used very early in the morning or in emergency situations. Cockfosters depot is located between Oakwood and Cockfosters and trains can enter or leave it from either direction.

In September 2020, works to provide step-free access were completed with a lift providing access to the platform, making Cockfosters the 80th accessible Tube station.

== Future property development ==
In the late 2010s, the station car park at Cockfosters was proposed by Transport for London's property arm Places for London for property development, as part of TfL's plans to increase the amount of income generated from land in their ownership. By September 2020, it was proposed that over 350 new homes (with 40% affordable homes) would be built on the current car park at the station by TfL and Grainger. The plans also included new public space, cycle parking and dedicated disabled car parking spaces. The proposal was criticised due to the loss of Tube car parking and the amount of new homes proposed on the site.

Despite approval from the local council, the development was blocked by Conservative Transport Secretary Grant Shapps in 2022, following campaigning by local residents and MP Theresa Villiers. In September 2024, Labour Transport Secretary Louise Haigh approved the development.

== Nearby attractions ==
- Trent Park
- The "London LOOP" walk uses the station's foot tunnel to cross Cockfosters Road.

== In popular culture ==
Cockfosters tube station features prominently in the novel While England Sleeps by American author David Leavitt. One of the novel's protagonists is writing a book entitled The Train to Cockfosters.

A commercial for Foster's Lager shown on UK television in the 1980s features Paul Hogan sitting in an Underground station near to a Japanese man who is looking at the Tube map on the wall. The man asks Hogan, "Can you tell me the way to Cockfosters?", to which Hogan replies, "Drink it warm, mate".

== Connections ==
London Buses day and nighttime routes serve the station.

== Bibliography ==
- Horne, Mike (2007). The Piccadilly Line. Capital Transport. ISBN 978-1-85414-305-1.

Preceding station	London Underground	Following station
Oakwood towards Uxbridge, Rayners Lane or Heathrow Airport (Terminal 4 or Terminal 5)	Piccadilly line	Terminus
