= Southgate tube station =

London Underground station

Southgate
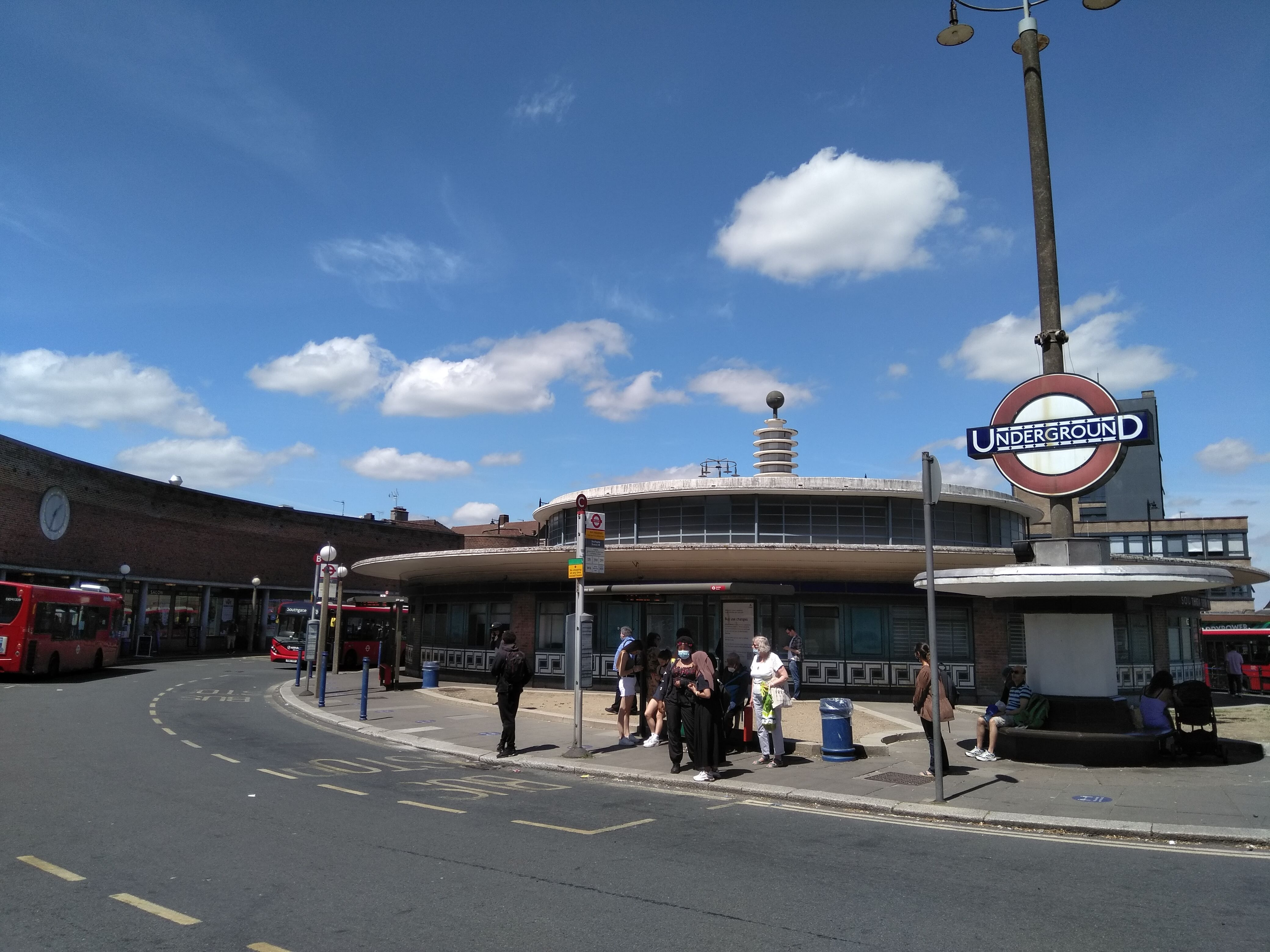
- Southgate station
- Interactive map of Southgate

General information
- Location: Southgate
- Local authority: London Borough of Enfield
- Managed by: London Underground
- Number of platforms: 2
- Fare zone: 4

London Underground annual entry and exit
- 2020: ▼2.71 million
- 2021: ▼2.31 million
- 2022: ▲3.78 million
- 2023: ▲3.95 million
- 2024: ▲4.08 million

Key dates
- 13 March 1933: Opened (Piccadilly line)
- 16 July 2018: Temporarily renamed 'Gareth Southgate' for 2 days

Listed status
- Listing grade: II* (since 28 July 2009)
- Entry number: 1188692
- Added to list: 19 February 1971; 55 years ago

Other information
- External links: TfL station info page
- Coordinates: 51.6325°N 0.12805°W

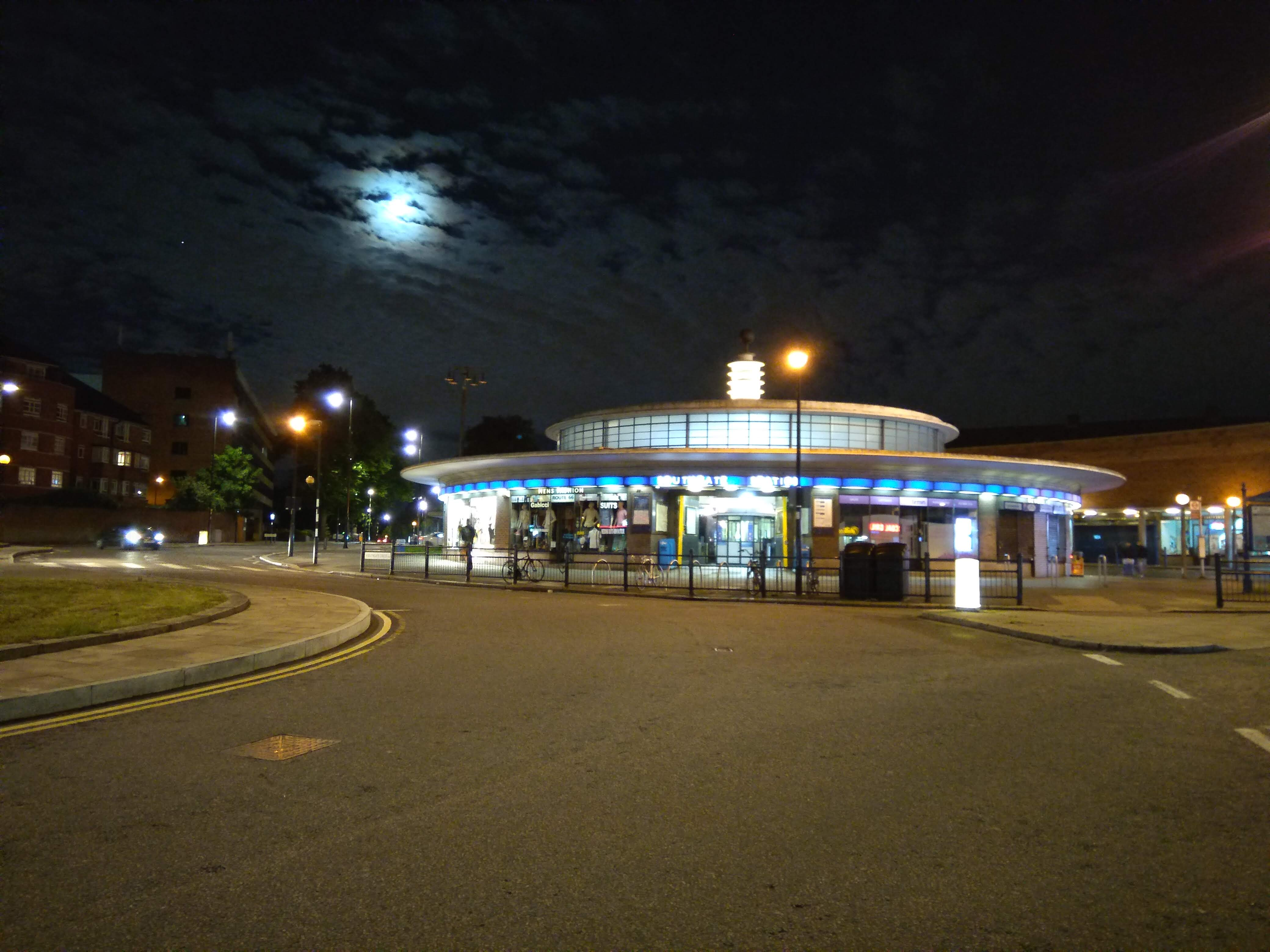
Southgate Station at night

Southgate is a London Underground station in Southgate in north London. It is on the Piccadilly line, between Arnos Grove and Oakwood stations. It is in London fare zone 4.

== History ==
Southgate station opened on 13 March 1933 with Oakwood on the second phase of the northern extension of the Piccadilly line from Finsbury Park to Cockfosters. Prior to the station's opening, alternative names were suggested including "Chase Side" and "Southgate Central". On opening, local residents were given a free return ticket to Piccadilly Circus.

On 19 June 2018, at around 19:00 BST there was an explosion at the entrance of the station, injuring five people.

On 16 July 2018, the tube station Southgate was renamed "Gareth Southgate" for two days in recognition of the efforts of the England football manager Gareth Southgate in leading the England team to fourth place in the 2018 FIFA World Cup. However, controversy soon followed after a video was posted to social media of a woman illegally tearing the sign down while laughing, prompting TfL to make a statement saying that she was not a member of the Tube Staff, nor had the authority to remove the sign.

== Architecture ==
The station is built in the Art Deco/Streamline Moderne design style using brick, reinforced concrete and glass and is one of the best known of the many stations Charles Holden designed for London Underground. The station building is circular with a flat projecting concrete roof. Externally, the flat roof of the raised central section appears, impossibly, to be supported by nothing more than a horizontal band of windows that provide daylight to the ticket hall. The roof is actually supported, umbrella-like, from a central column within the ticket hall. The whole building is topped by an illuminated feature resembling a Tesla coil, designed to look as if it is taken from Frankenstein's laboratory.

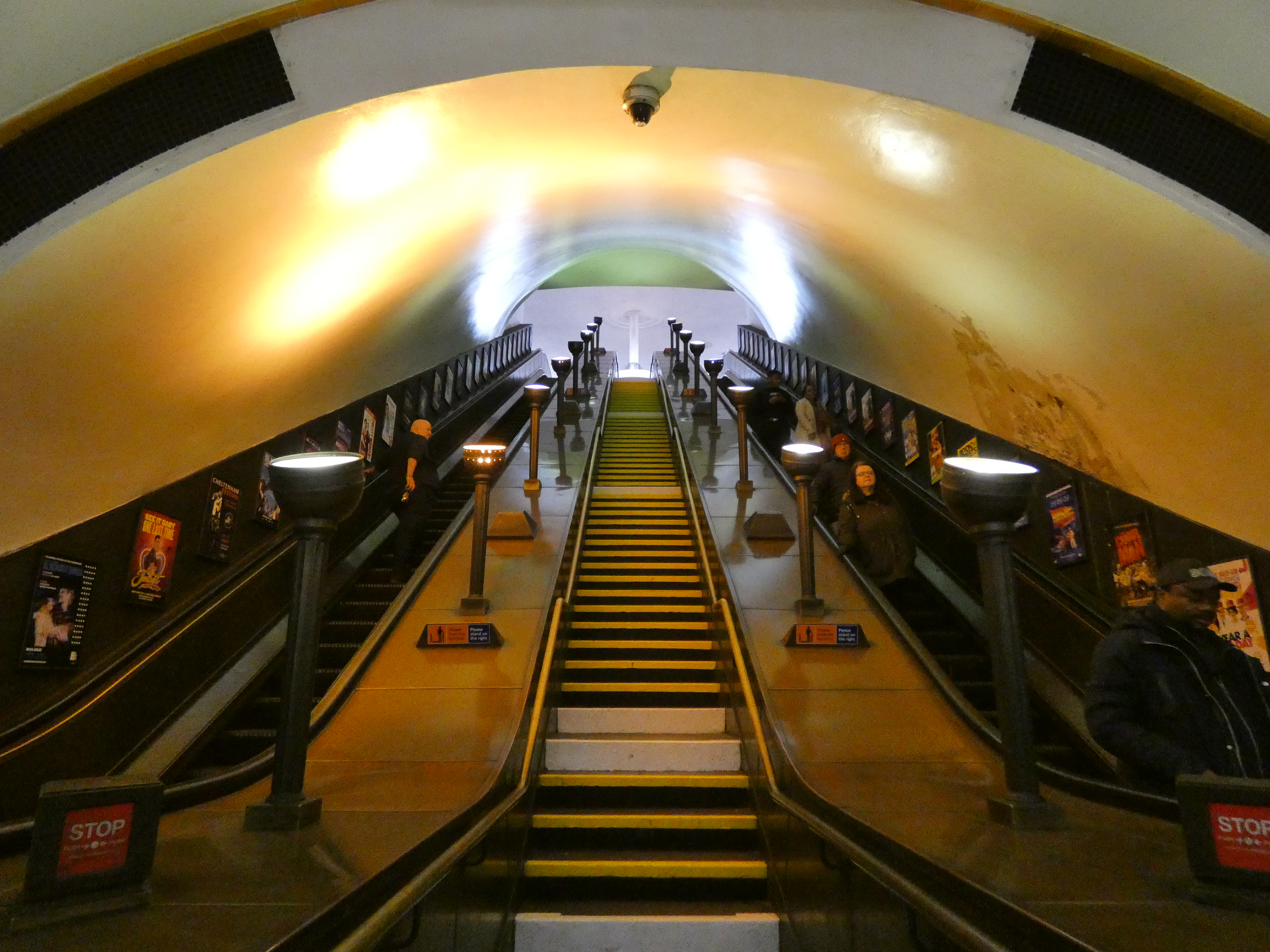
Escalators with bronze uplighters at Southgate Station

Like Arnos Grove, Oakwood and Cockfosters, Southgate is a listed building in this case at Grade II* (regraded from Grade II in 2009) and retains much of its original decoration. The two escalators have the original column lighting, while bronze panelling is in evidence throughout the station. However; the station is not without change: in the late 1990s, one of the three entrances was filled in to be used as a new ticket office, and due to the design of the automatic barriers, one of the two remaining entrances is exit only.

In 2008, the station was extensively renovated, with new tiling at platform level, a partial new floor in the main ticket hall, and improved signage throughout. The station won the London Regional category award at the 2008 National Railway Heritage Awards for the modernisation of a heritage station.

The original escalators were replaced in the late 1980s with the then standard London Transport design. The balustrade of the escalators was manufactured from bronze, rather than aluminium to maintain the 1930s period appearance of the station and to satisfy the requirements of English Heritage.

The preserved condition of the station's original features, particularly the escalators, makes Southgate popular for filming scenes for period dramas.

== Location ==
The station was developed as a bus/underground interchange and the main building sits on an island between Southgate Circus and Station Parade where a series of bus stops are located. A secondary building containing shops wraps around the other side of the parade.

The station is located on a hill and whereas the platforms at the stations on each side are on the surface those at Southgate are in a short section of tunnel. The tunnel portals are visible from the platforms when looking north, a unique occurrence for a deep-level London Underground station. As usual on the Piccadilly line, the platforms are labelled Westbound and Eastbound. However, the tunnels run more or less north-east to south-west at Southgate, so eastbound is north-eastbound and westbound is south-westbound.

In the early 1980s, moving picture advertising was tested in the tunnels south of the station. The pictures were of a child on a beach turning to face the camera.

Southgate is the northernmost station in tunnels on the network.

== Connections ==
A number of day and nighttime London Buses routes serve the station.

| Preceding station | London Underground | Following station |
|---|---|---|
| Arnos Grove towards Uxbridge, Rayners Lane or Heathrow Airport (Terminal 4 or Terminal 5) | Piccadilly line | Oakwood towards Cockfosters |
