= Oakwood tube station =

London Underground station

Oakwood
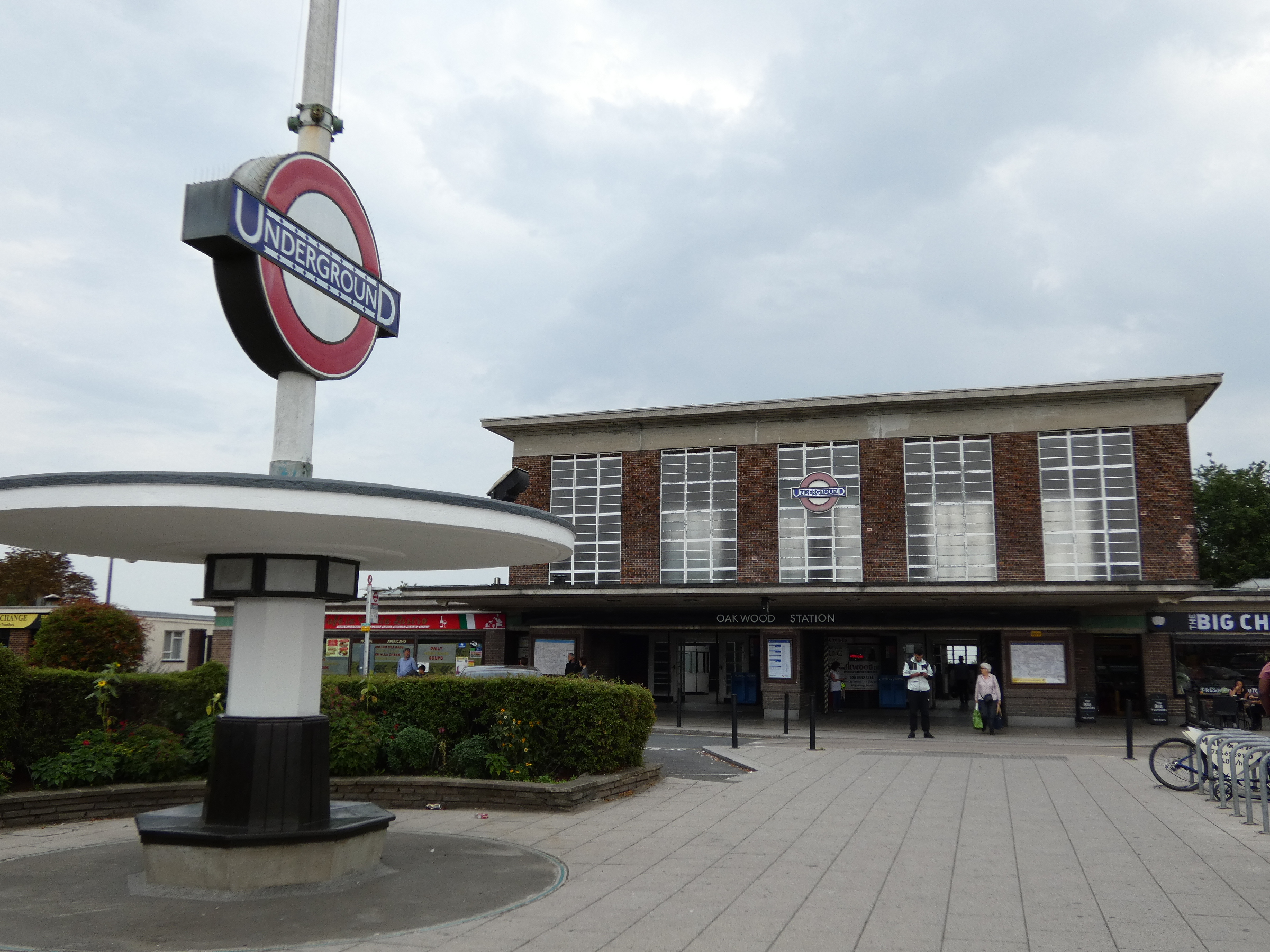
- Oakwood station
- Interactive map of Oakwood

General information
- Location: Oakwood
- Local authority: Enfield
- Managed by: London Underground
- Number of platforms: 2
- Accessible: Yes
- Fare zone: 5

London Underground annual entry and exit
- 2020: ▼1.31 million
- 2021: ▼1.29 million
- 2022: ▲2.23 million
- 2023: ▲2.31 million
- 2024: 2.31 million

Railway companies
- Original company: London Electric Railway

Key dates
- 13 March 1933: Station opened as Enfield West
- 31 July 1933: Line extended to Cockfosters
- 3 May 1934: Renamed Enfield West (Oakwood)
- 1 September 1946: Renamed Oakwood

Listed status
- Listing grade: II* (since 20 July 2011)
- Entry number: 1078930
- Added to list: 19 February 1971; 55 years ago

Other information
- External links: TfL station info page
- Coordinates: 51.6475°N 0.1317°W

Oakwood is a London Underground station. It is on the Piccadilly line between Southgate and Cockfosters stations, and is in London fare zone 5. The station is located on the edge of the Oakwood area of Enfield (N14) and is situated at the junction of Bramley Road (A110) and Chase Road (the other end of Chase Road is close to Southgate tube station). This station has step-free access after the upgrades made to the station between October and December 2007.

== Design ==
The station building is a fine example of the architecture Charles Holden designed for the Piccadilly line extensions, with a large and imposing box-shaped ticket hall surrounded by lower structures containing shops. The ceiling of the booking hall is particularly monumental and bold. The whole design mirrors proportions found in classical architecture, albeit in a distinctly 20th century structure. The dimensions of the ticket hall are approximately a "double-cube" (its front elevation is roughly twice its height and width). The station is similar to Holden's slightly earlier designs for Sudbury Town and Acton Town stations at the western end of Piccadilly line. Oakwood Station is a Grade II* listed building.

== History ==
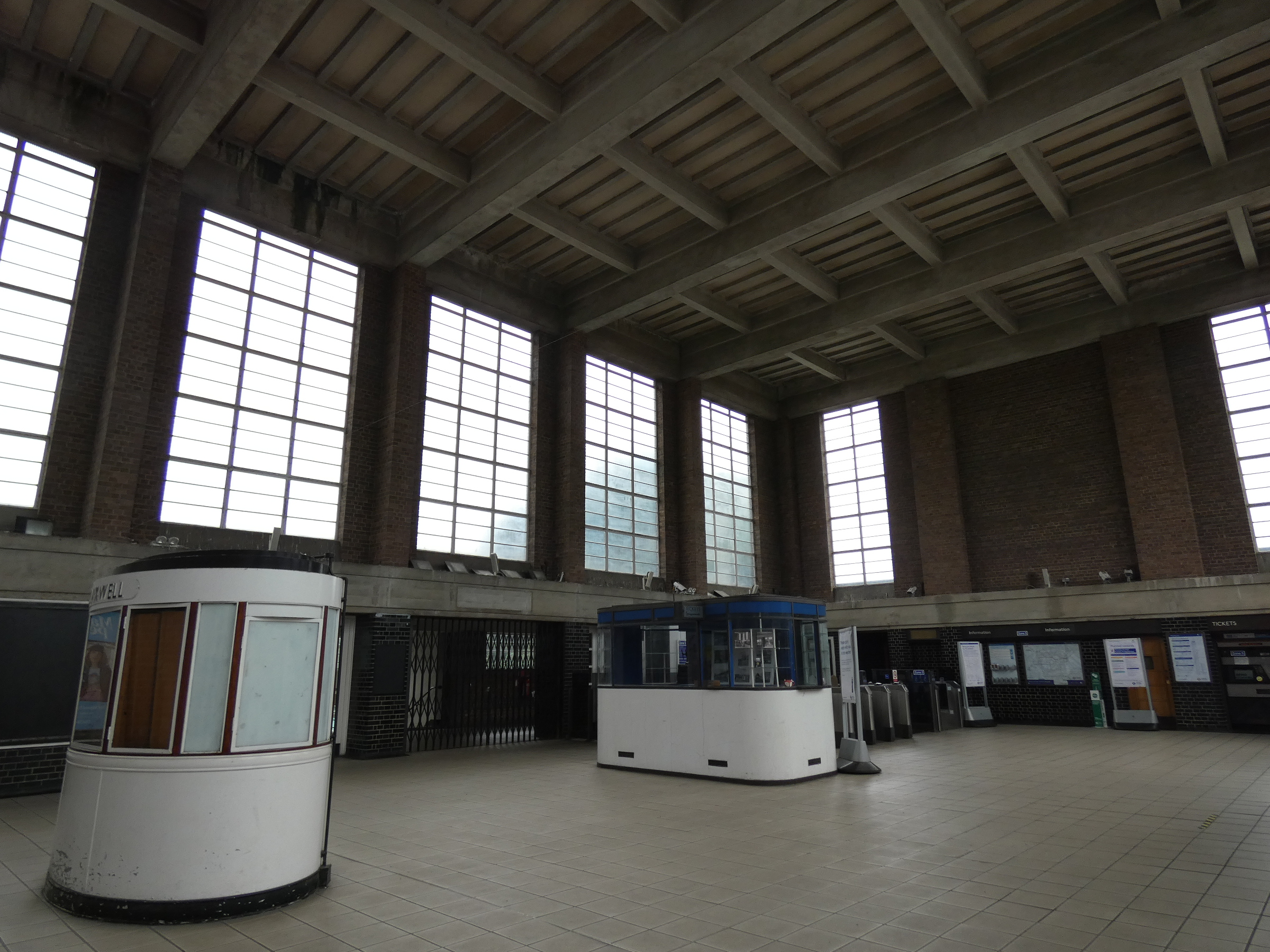
Oakwood Station's interior

The station opened on 13 March 1933 as part of the Cockfosters extension, its original name being Enfield West. The station did not appear on the original plans to extend the Piccadilly line beyond Finsbury Park, which only provided for seven additional stations, however it served as the line's terminus for a brief period before Cockfosters station was opened.

Before the station opened, the Underground Electric Railways Company of London (forerunner of London Underground) suggested names for it including Oakwood, Merryhills and East Barnet, but it was named Enfield West at opening and renamed Enfield West (Oakwood) the following year. The Enfield West station name proved unpopular with passengers heading for shops and offices in Enfield, as it is about 2 miles away. Following protests from Southgate Council, it was eventually renamed Oakwood on 1 September 1946.

Like other extensions of the London Underground lines, the opening of the Cockfosters extension stimulated the rapid development of new suburbs and much of the open countryside that existed in 1930 when construction started was quickly covered by new housing developments.

=== 2006–2007 upgrade ===
In early October 2006 to December 2007, the station underwent an upgrade as part of London Underground's £10 billion upgrade to the whole of the London Underground Network. As part of this, a new lift was installed to provide step-free access to the platforms. The public address system was also improved, with new information indicators installed on the platforms and inside the ticket hall. In addition 27 new CCTV cameras were installed in the station bringing the total number to 29.

Preceding station	London Underground	Following station
Southgate towards Uxbridge, Rayners Lane or Heathrow Airport (Terminal 4 or Terminal 5)	Piccadilly line	Cockfosters Terminus
