= Harrow and Uxbridge Railway =

British railway company

The Harrow and Uxbridge Railway Company was a British railway company. It was established in 1897 under the auspices of the Harrow and Uxbridge Railway Act 1897 (60 & 61 Vict. c. cclvi).

In 1904, it opened what is now the Uxbridge branch of the Metropolitan line, connecting Uxbridge to the Metropolitan Railway near Roxborough Lane (now Roxborough Road) close to Harrow-on-the-Hill station. The original Uxbridge terminus was a station at Belmont Road that was later replaced when the line was extended closer to the town centre in 1938. The buildings of the original terminus were eventually demolished in the 1960s.

Services on the branch opened on 4 July 1904, with the first service on the line being headed by the steam locomotive Met Loco No. 1, bedecked in bunting. At the opening, the only intermediate station on the branch was at Ruislip. Additional stations were opened at Ickenham (1905), Eastcote and Rayners Lane (1906), Ruislip Manor (1912), West Harrow (1913) and Hillingdon (1923). The company was absorbed into the Metropolitan Railway in 1906, following legislation in Parliament.

As of 2013, the records of the Harrow and Uxbridge Railway Company were held in the London Metropolitan Archives.
