= Hillingdon tube station =

London Underground station

Hillingdon
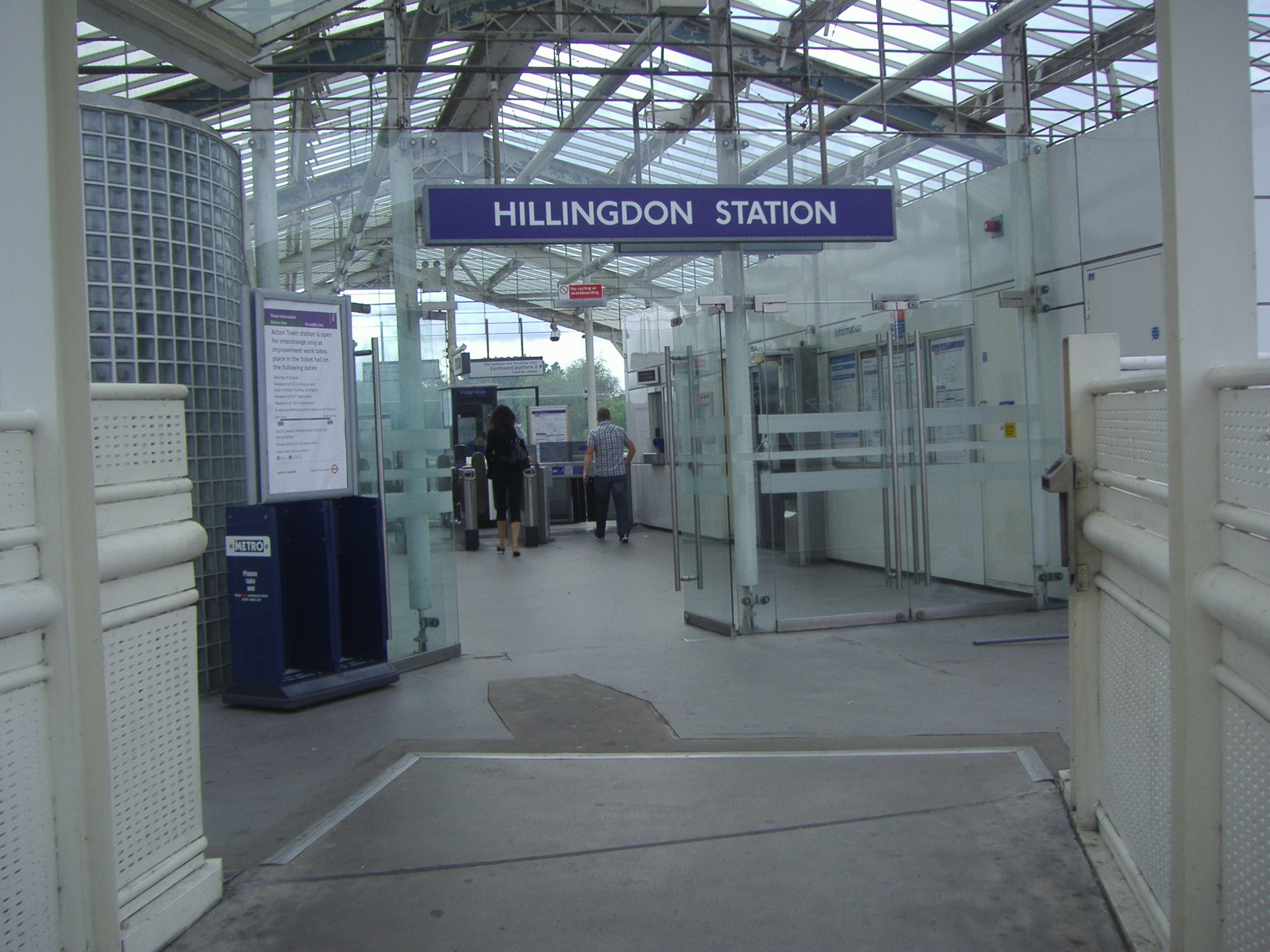
- Interior of the station entrance
- Interactive map of Hillingdon

General information
- Location: Hillingdon
- Local authority: London Borough of Hillingdon
- Managed by: London Underground
- Number of platforms: 2
- Accessible: Yes
- Fare zone: 6

London Underground annual entry and exit
- 2020: ▼0.84 million
- 2021: ▼0.75 million
- 2022: ▲1.33 million
- 2023: ▲1.37 million
- 2024: ▲1.44 million

Key dates
- 4 July 1904: Line opened (Metropolitan)
- 10 December 1923: Opened (Metropolitan & District)
- 23 October 1933: End (District)
- 23 October 1933: Start (Piccadilly)
- 10 August 1964: Goods yard closed
- 6 December 1992: Station reopened at new location

Other information
- External links: TfL station info page
- Coordinates: 51.5538°N 0.45°W

Hillingdon is a London Underground station in North Hillingdon in the London Borough of Hillingdon, West London. It is on the Uxbridge branches of both the Metropolitan and Piccadilly lines, between Uxbridge and Ickenham stations. The station is in London fare zone 6. Resited in 1992, it is also the most recently constructed station on the Metropolitan line.

== History ==
The Metropolitan Railway (Harrow & Uxbridge Railway) constructed the line between Harrow on the Hill and Uxbridge; this was opened on 4 July 1904, with an intermediate station at Ruislip. At first services were operated by steam trains, before electrification was completed on 1 January 1905.

The original station building, 1933

Development in north Middlesex over the next two decades led to the opening of additional stations to encourage the growth of new residential areas. Hillingdon was the last of these to open, on 10 December 1923, with Metropolitan and District line services.

On 23 October 1933, the District line service was replaced by the Piccadilly line. Between the mid-1930s and the mid-1950s the station was named Hillingdon (Swakeleys), a name which is still displayed on the platform roundels. The goods yard closed in August 1964.

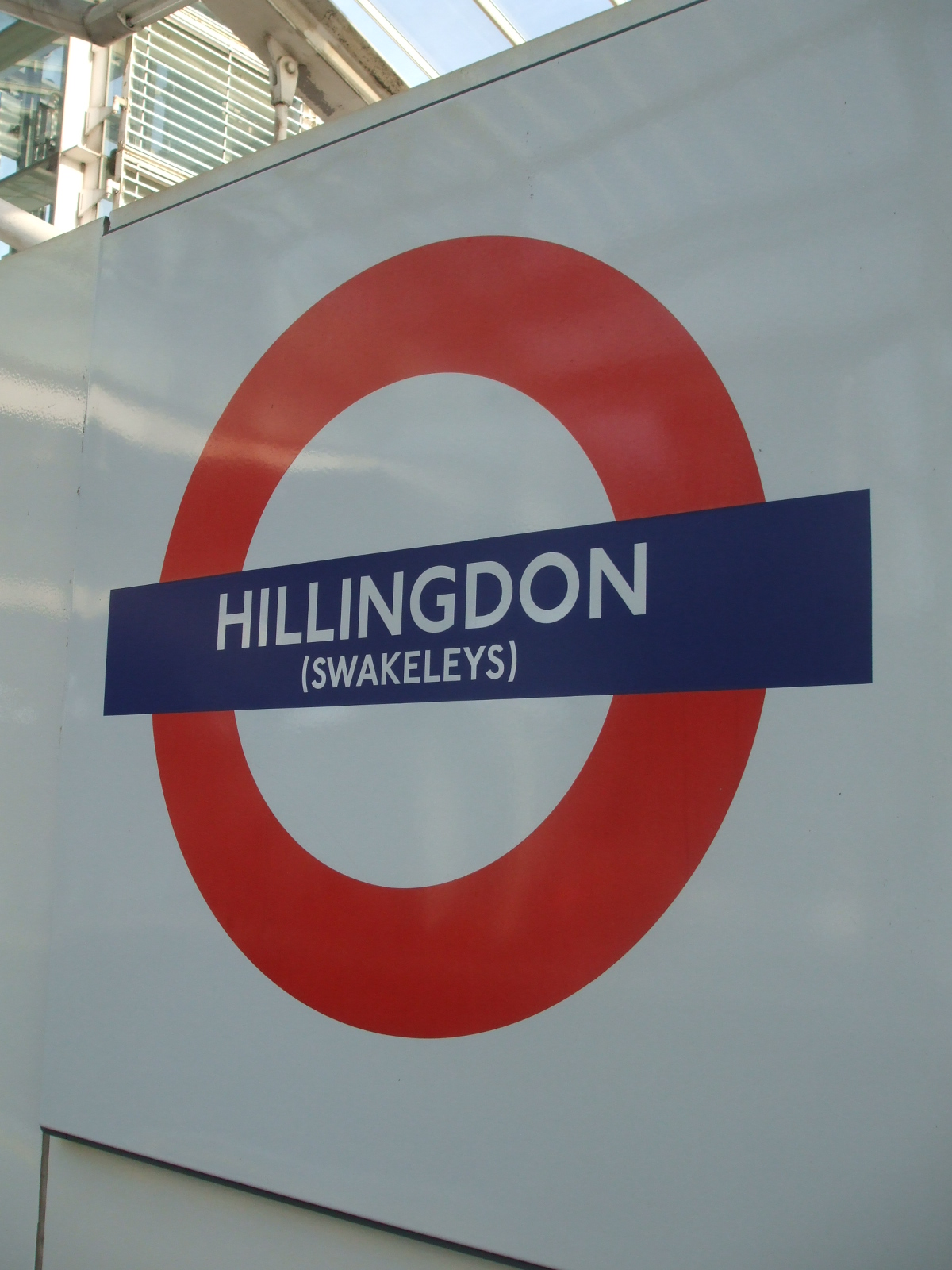
The current station roundel still has its original station name. "Swakeleys" is a reference to the nearby junction on the A40 Western Avenue.

=== New station in 1990s ===
To enable the widening of the A40 (Western Avenue) at Hillingdon Circus, the old station was demolished and a new station built to the south. Designed by architects Cassidy Taggart Partnership in a deconstructivist design, the new station opened to the south of the original on 6 December 1992. Widely acclaimed, the station received a 1996 Civic Trust Award for its design and the 1994 Underground Station of the Year award. The station was identified in July 2011 as one of the London Borough of Hillingdon's locally listed buildings.

The station has a car park and is accessible for those with disabilities without using stairs or escalators. It is staffed, but the ticket office was closed in July 2015. Next-train indicators were installed in the ticket hall and on both platforms during May 2016; this coincided with works aimed at improving the station, including cleaning the glass station canopy and sealing off areas of the roof to deter nesting birds.

In September 2019, a fight on the platform led to the murder of 20 year old Tashan Daniel. His two assailants were convicted of murder and manslaughter.

== Services ==
Hillingdon station is on the Uxbridge branches of both the Metropolitan and Piccadilly lines in London fare zone 6. It is between Uxbridge to the west and Ickenham to the east.

=== Metropolitan line ===
The Metropolitan line is the only line to operate an express service, though currently for Metropolitan Line trains on the Uxbridge branch this is eastbound only in the morning peaks (06:30 to 09:30) Monday to Friday.

The off-peak service in trains per hour (tph) is:

- 8 tph Eastbound to Aldgate via Baker Street (all stations)
- 8 tph Westbound to Uxbridge

The morning peak service in trains per hour (tph) is:

- 2 tph Eastbound to Aldgate via Baker Street (semi-fast)
- 4 tph Eastbound to Aldgate via Baker Street (all stations)
- 4 tph Eastbound to Baker Street (all stations)
- 10 tph Westbound to Uxbridge

The evening peak service in trains per hour (tph) is:

- 7 tph Eastbound to Aldgate via Baker Street (all stations)
- 3 tph Eastbound to Baker Street (all stations)
- 10 tph Westbound to Uxbridge

=== Piccadilly line ===
Between Rayners Lane and Uxbridge there is no Piccadilly Line service before approximately 06:30 (Monday - Friday) and 08:45 (Saturday - Sunday), except for one early morning departure from Uxbridge at 05:18 (Monday - Saturday) and 06:46 (Sunday).

The off-peak service in trains per hour (tph) is:

- 3 tph Eastbound to Cockfosters
- 3 tph Westbound to Uxbridge

The peak time service in trains per hour (tph) is:

- 6 tph Eastbound to Cockfosters
- 6 tph Westbound to Uxbridge

Preceding station	London Underground	Following station
Uxbridge Terminus	Metropolitan line Uxbridge branch	Ickenham towards Baker Street or Aldgate
Uxbridge Terminus	Piccadilly line Uxbridge branch	Ickenham towards Cockfosters or Arnos Grove
Former services
Preceding station	London Underground	Following station
Uxbridge Terminus	District line (1923-1933)	Ickenham towards Upminster

== Connections ==
- London Buses routes 278 and U2
- Oxford Tube
