= Harrow Garden Village =

Housing development in London, England

Coordinates: 51°34′40″N 0°22′00″W

Harrow Garden Village was a housing development in the 1930s around Rayners Lane Underground station in London, England, which until then had been a "country halt" on the Metropolitan line. This was Metro-land's flagship development, begun in by E S Reid, with streets full of semi-detached houses fronted with bay windows and tiled roofs.
