= Ickenham tube station =

London Underground station

Ickenham
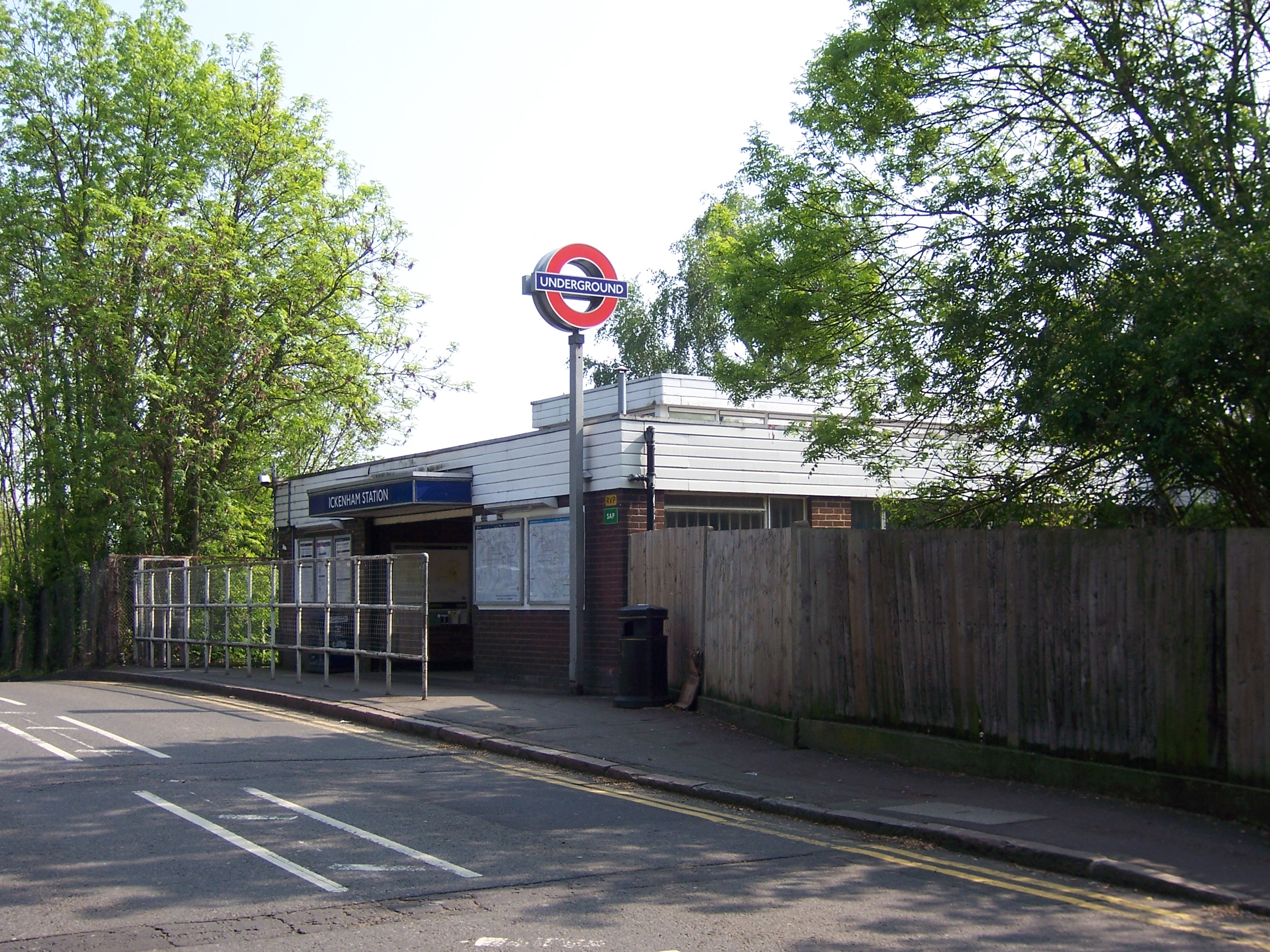
- Station building
- Interactive map of Ickenham

General information
- Location: Ickenham
- Local authority: Hillingdon
- Managed by: London Underground
- Number of platforms: 2
- Accessible: Yes
- Fare zone: 6
- OSI: West Ruislip

London Underground annual entry and exit
- 2020: ▼0.55 million
- 2021: ▼0.48 million
- 2022: ▲0.82 million
- 2023: ▲0.85 million
- 2024: ▲0.87 million

Railway companies
- Original company: Metropolitan Railway

Key dates
- 4 July 1904: Line opened
- 25 September 1905: Station opened
- 1 March 1910: District service commences
- 23 October 1933: District line service replaced by Piccadilly line

Other information
- External links: TfL station info page
- Coordinates: 51.56194°N 0.44194°W

Ickenham (/ˈɪkənəm/) is a London Underground station, located in Ickenham in the London Borough of Hillingdon. It is on the Uxbridge branches of both the Metropolitan and Piccadilly lines, between Hillingdon and Ruislip stations. It is in London fare zone 6.

== History ==
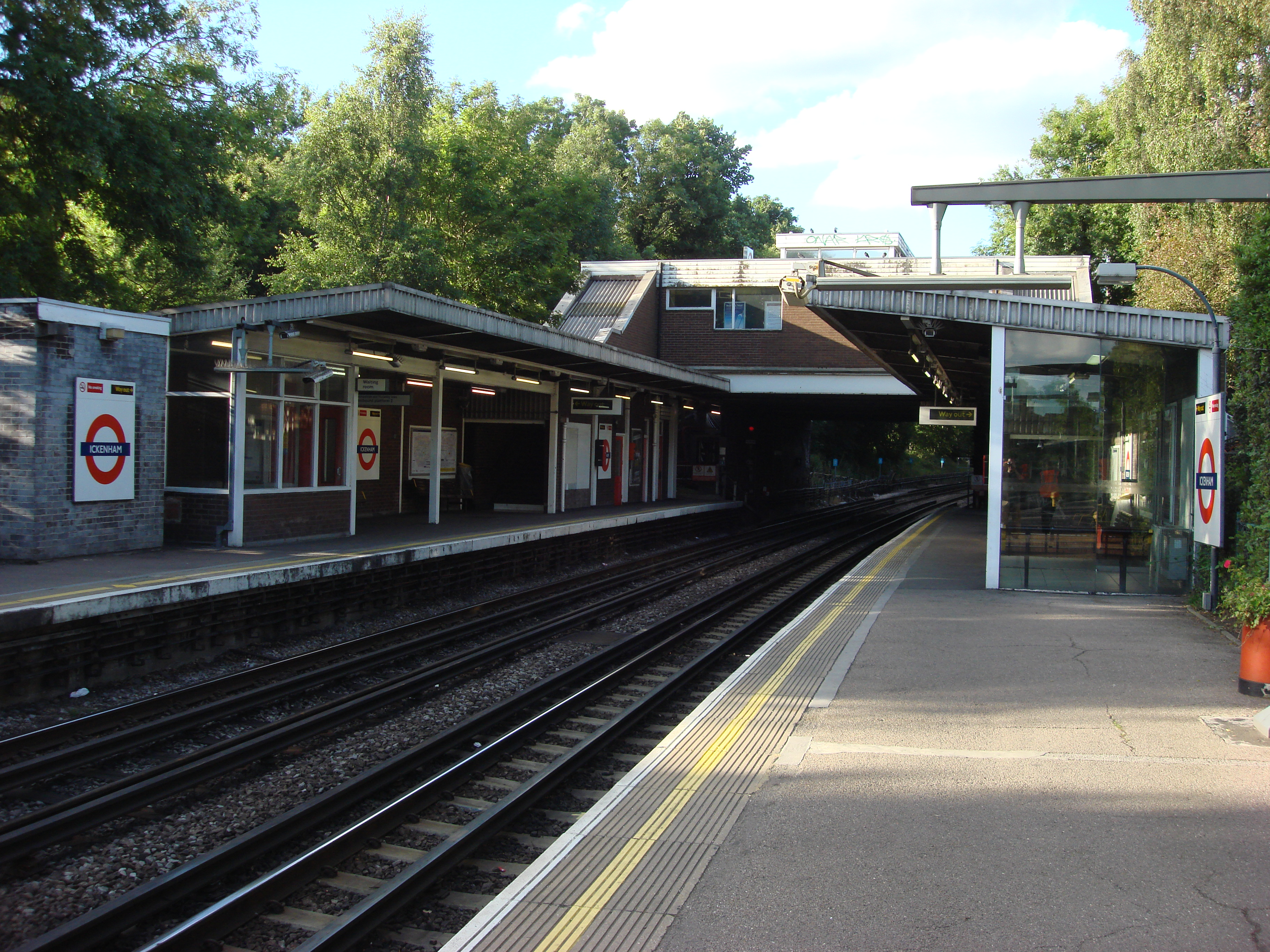
Westbound platform looking east towards Ruislip

The Metropolitan Railway (Harrow and Uxbridge Railway) constructed the line through Ickenham between Harrow on the Hill and Uxbridge and commenced services on 4 July 1904 with, initially, the only intermediate stop being at Ruislip. At first, services were operated by steam trains, but track electrification was completed in the subsequent months and electric trains began operating on 1 January 1905.

Progressive development in the north Middlesex area over the next two decades led to the gradual opening of additional stations along the Uxbridge branch to encourage the growth of new residential areas. On 25 September 1905 a small halt was opened as Ickenham Halt by the Metropolitan Railway, following lobbying by the Ickenham Parish Council. The railway company had been reluctant to open a station in the area due to a perceived lack of revenue and so a compromise was reached with the halt.

The new halt brought with it travellers from London seeking a day out in rural surroundings. Villagers living near the halt sold flowers from their gardens and served teas. The parish council later requested shelters for passengers on the platforms, which were built in December 1905. A booking hut followed in 1910. The platforms, which had been too short for trains to call at fully, were extended in 1922.

On 1 March 1910, an extension of the District line from South Harrow to connect with the Metropolitan Railway at Rayners Lane was opened, enabling District line trains to serve stations between Rayners Lane and Uxbridge from that date. On 23 October 1933 District line services were replaced by Piccadilly line trains.

The station was rebuilt into its present form between 1970 and 1971 replacing the 'halt' structures dating from 1905.

In 2018, it was announced that the station would gain step free access by 2022, as part of a £200m investment to increase the number of accessible stations on the Tube.

== Services ==
Ickenham station is on the Uxbridge branches of both the Metropolitan and Piccadilly lines in London fare zone 6. It is between Hillingdon to the west and Ruislip to the east.

=== Metropolitan line ===
The Metropolitan Line is the only line to operate an express service, though currently for Metropolitan Line trains on the Uxbridge branch this is eastbound only in the morning peaks (06:30 to 09:30) Monday to Friday.

The off-peak service in trains per hour (tph) is:

- 8 tph Eastbound to Aldgate via Baker Street (all stations)
- 8 tph Westbound to Uxbridge

The morning peak service in trains per hour (tph) is:

- 2 tph Eastbound to Aldgate via Baker Street (semi-fast)
- 4 tph Eastbound to Aldgate via Baker Street (all stations)
- 4 tph Eastbound to Baker Street (all stations)
- 10 tph Westbound to Uxbridge

The evening peak service in trains per hour (tph) is:

- 7 tph Eastbound to Aldgate via Baker Street (all stations)
- 3 tph Eastbound to Baker Street (all stations)
- 10 tph Westbound to Uxbridge

=== Piccadilly line ===
Between Rayners Lane and Uxbridge there is no Piccadilly Line service before approximately 06:30 (Monday – Friday) and 08:45 (Saturday – Sunday), except for one early morning departure from Uxbridge at 05:18 (Monday – Saturday) and 06:46 (Sunday).

The off-peak service in trains per hour (tph) is:

- 3 tph Eastbound to Cockfosters
- 3 tph Westbound to Uxbridge

The peak time service in trains per hour (tph) is:

- 6 tph Eastbound to Cockfosters
- 6 tph Westbound to Uxbridge

Preceding station	London Underground	Following station
Hillingdon towards Uxbridge	Metropolitan line Uxbridge branch	Ruislip towards Baker Street or Aldgate
Hillingdon towards Uxbridge	Piccadilly line Uxbridge branch	Ruislip towards Cockfosters or Arnos Grove
Former services
Preceding station	London Underground	Following station
Hillingdon towards Uxbridge	District line (1910–1933)	Ruislip towards Upminster

== Connections ==
London Buses routes U10 and 278 serve the station.
