= ZRL =

ZRL could refer to:

- Rayners Lane tube station, London, England; National Rail station code ZRL.
- Zambia Railways Limited
- ZRL.US Mobile Community
- Zweckverband SPNV Ruhr-Lippe, Germany
- IBM Research – Zurich Research Laboratory (ZRL)
