= West Harrow tube station =

London Underground station

West Harrow
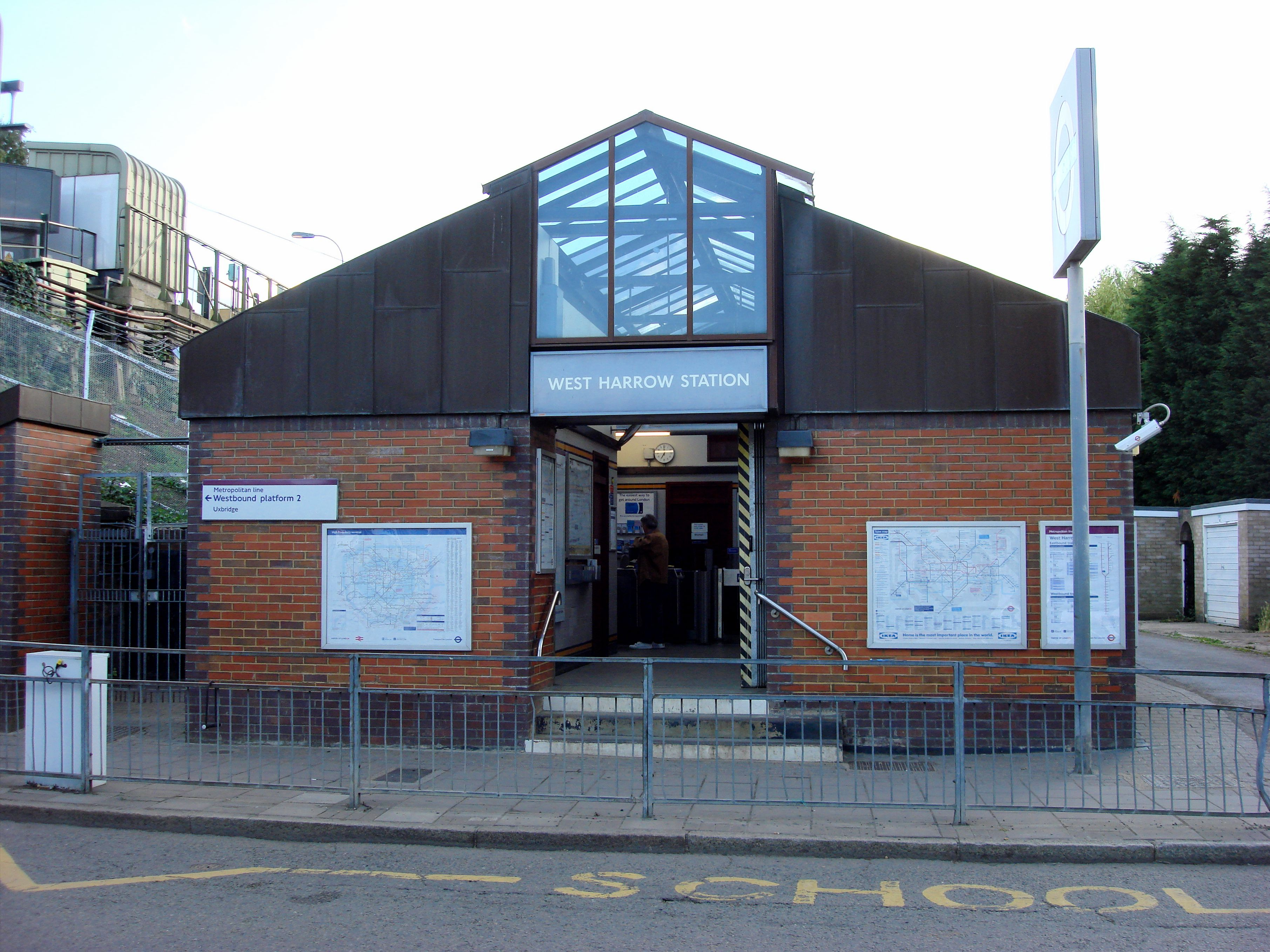
- Station entrance
- Interactive map of West Harrow

General information
- Location: Harrow
- Local authority: London Borough of Harrow
- Managed by: London Underground
- Number of platforms: 2
- Fare zone: 5

London Underground annual entry and exit
- 2021: ▼0.56 million
- 2022: ▲0.94 million
- 2023: ▲1.00 million
- 2024: ▲1.17 million
- 2025: ▲1.20 million

Railway companies
- Original company: Metropolitan Railway

Key dates
- 4 July 1904: Line opened
- 17 November 1913: Station opened

Other information
- External links: TfL station info page
- Coordinates: 51.57972°N 0.35333°W

West Harrow is a London Underground station in Harrow, north-west London. It is on the Uxbridge branch of the Metropolitan line, between Rayners Lane and Harrow-on-the-Hill stations. It is in London fare zone 5.

West Harrow is the only station on the Uxbridge branch of the Metropolitan line to be served exclusively by the line itself.

== History ==
The Metropolitan (Harrow and Uxbridge Railway) line passed through here between Harrow-on-the-Hill and Ruislip, with services beginning on 4 July 1904. West Harrow station opened on 17 November 1913.

The line here passes over the road where The Gardens becomes Vaughan Road.

The station is one of the few underground stations without ticket barriers at one of the entrances, with passengers travelling towards Uxbridge able to access the platforms without passing through a ticket barrier.

== Services ==
West Harrow station is on the Uxbridge branch of the Metropolitan line in London fare zone 5. It is between Rayners Lane to the west and Harrow-on-the-Hill to the east.

The Metropolitan line is the only line in the network to operate an express service, though currently for Metropolitan line trains on the Uxbridge branch this is southbound only during the morning peaks (06:30 to 09:30) Monday to Friday.

Southbound semi-fast trains do not stop at Northwick Park, Preston Road and Wembley Park.

The off-peak service in trains per hour (tph) is:

- 8 tph to Aldgate (all stations)
- 8 tph to Uxbridge

The morning peak service in trains per hour (tph) is:

- 2 tph to Aldgate (semi-fast)
- 4 tph to Aldgate (all stations)
- 4 tph to Baker Street (all stations)
- 10 tph to Uxbridge

The evening peak service in trains per hour (tph) is:

- 7 tph to Aldgate (all stations)
- 3 tph to Baker Street (all stations)
- 10 tph to Uxbridge

Preceding station	London Underground	Following station
Rayners Lane towards Uxbridge	Metropolitan line Uxbridge branch	Harrow-on-the-Hill towards Baker Street or Aldgate
