= Ruislip Manor tube station =

London Underground station

Ruislip Manor
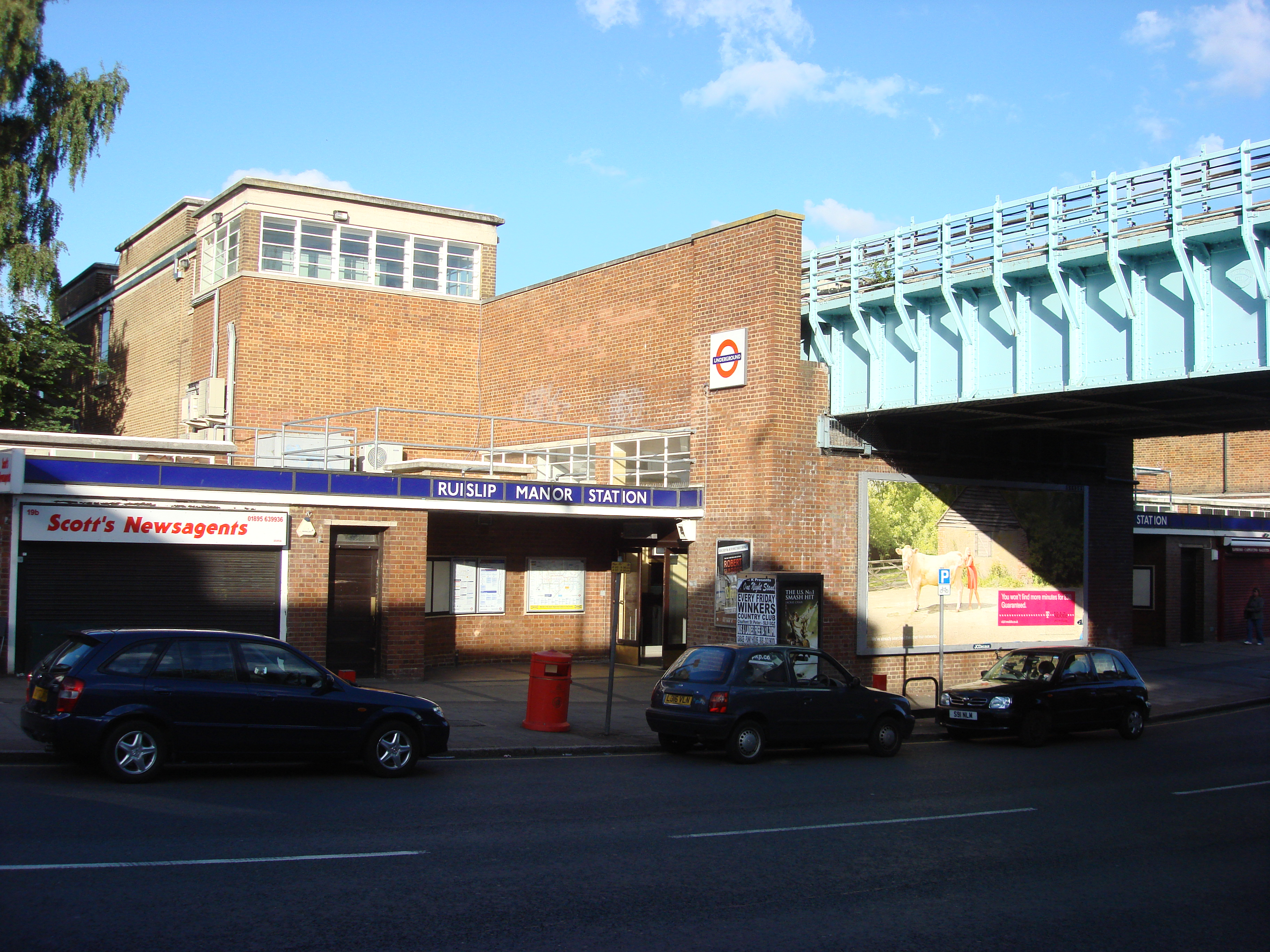
- Station entrance
- Interactive map of Ruislip Manor

General information
- Location: Ruislip Manor
- Local authority: London Borough of Hillingdon
- Managed by: London Underground
- Number of platforms: 2
- Fare zone: 6

London Underground annual entry and exit
- 2020: ▼0.99 million
- 2021: ▼0.84 million
- 2022: ▲1.35 million
- 2023: ▲1.40 million
- 2024: ▲1.42 million

Railway companies
- Original company: Metropolitan Railway

Key dates
- 4 July 1904: Line opened
- 5 August 1912: Opened as Ruislip Manor Halt (Metropolitan & District lines)
- 12 February 1917: Closed
- 1 April 1919: Re-opened
- ?: Renamed Ruislip Manor
- 23 October 1933: District line service replaced by Piccadilly line

Other information
- External links: TfL station info page
- Coordinates: 51.57333°N 0.41250°W

Ruislip Manor (/ˈraɪslɪp ˈmænər/) is a London Underground station in Ruislip Manor in west London. It is on the Uxbridge branches of both the Metropolitan and Piccadilly lines, between Ruislip and Eastcote stations. The station is located on Victoria Road, where the line crosses on a bridge: there are two curved entrances, with access to the platforms being by stairways. It is in London fare zone 6. The closest station on the Central line is Ruislip Gardens.

== History ==
The Metropolitan Railway (Harrow and Uxbridge Railway) constructed the line through Ruislip Manor between Harrow on the Hill and Uxbridge and commenced services on 4 July 1904 with, initially, the only intermediate stop being at Ruislip. At first, services were operated by steam trains, but track electrification was completed in the subsequent months and electric trains began operating on 1 January 1905.

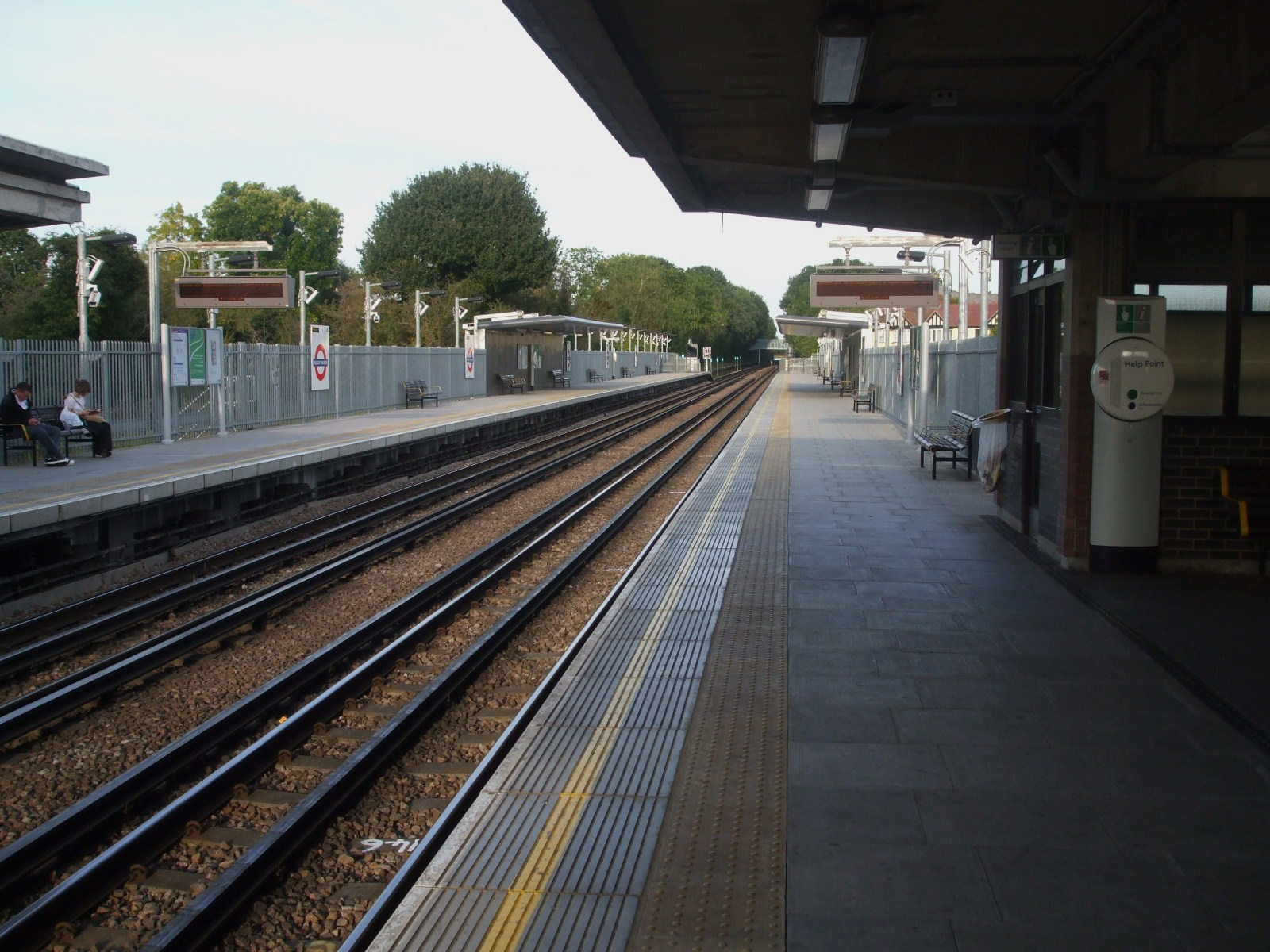
Westbound platform looking east

On 1 March 1910, an extension of the District line from South Harrow to connect with the Metropolitan Railway at Rayners Lane was opened enabling District line trains to serve stations between Rayners Lane and Uxbridge from that date.

Progressive development in the west Middlesex area over the next two decades lead to the gradual opening of additional stations along the Uxbridge branch to encourage the growth of new residential areas. Ruislip Manor opened on 5 August 1912 as Ruislip Manor Halt.

On 23 October 1933 District line services were replaced by Piccadilly line trains.

During the 1930s the number of passengers using the station increased greatly - from 17,000 in 1931 to 1.25m in 1937. To serve this enlarged number, a rebuilt station was opened on 26 June 1938.

The station was given a major overhaul during 2005–2006. Both platforms were sequentially rebuilt, resulting in trains not stopping at each platform for a period of approximately four months. Work was completed in Autumn 2006. Local Green Party members commented that improved disability access has not been included in this overhaul.

== Services ==
Ruislip Manor station is on the Uxbridge branches of both the Metropolitan and Piccadilly lines in London fare zone 6. It is between Ruislip to the west and Eastcote to the east.

=== Metropolitan line ===
The Metropolitan Line is the only line to operate an express service, though currently for Metropolitan Line trains on the Uxbridge branch this is eastbound only in the morning peaks (06:30 to 09:30) Monday to Friday.

The off-peak service in trains per hour (tph) is:

- 8 tph Eastbound to Aldgate via Baker Street (all stations)
- 8 tph Westbound to Uxbridge

The morning peak service in trains per hour ( tph) is:

- 2 tph Eastbound to Aldgate via Baker Street (semi-fast)
- 4 tph Eastbound to Aldgate via Baker Street (all stations)
- 4 tph Eastbound to Baker Street (all stations)
- 10 tph Westbound to Uxbridge

The evening peak service in trains per hour ( tph) is:

- 7 tph Eastbound to Aldgate via Baker Street (all stations)
- 3 tph Eastbound to Baker Street (all stations)
- 10 tph Westbound to Uxbridge

=== Piccadilly line ===
Between Rayners Lane and Uxbridge there is no Piccadilly Line service before approximately 06:30 (Monday - Friday) and 08:45 (Saturday - Sunday), except for one early morning departure from Uxbridge at 05:18 (Monday - Saturday) and 06:46 (Sunday).

The off-peak service in trains per hour ( tph) is:

- 3 tph Eastbound to Cockfosters
- 3 tph Westbound to Uxbridge

The peak time service in trains per hour ( tph) is:

- 6 tph Eastbound to Cockfosters
- 6 tph Westbound to Uxbridge

Preceding station	London Underground	Following station
Ruislip towards Uxbridge	Metropolitan line Uxbridge branch	Eastcote towards Baker Street or Aldgate
Ruislip towards Uxbridge	Piccadilly line Uxbridge branch	Eastcote towards Cockfosters or Arnos Grove
Former service
Preceding station	London Underground	Following station
Ruislip towards Uxbridge	District line (1912–1933)	Eastcote towards Upminster

== Connections ==
Several London Buses routes serve the station.
