= Ruislip Manor =

Coordinates: 51.566754°N 0.407218°W

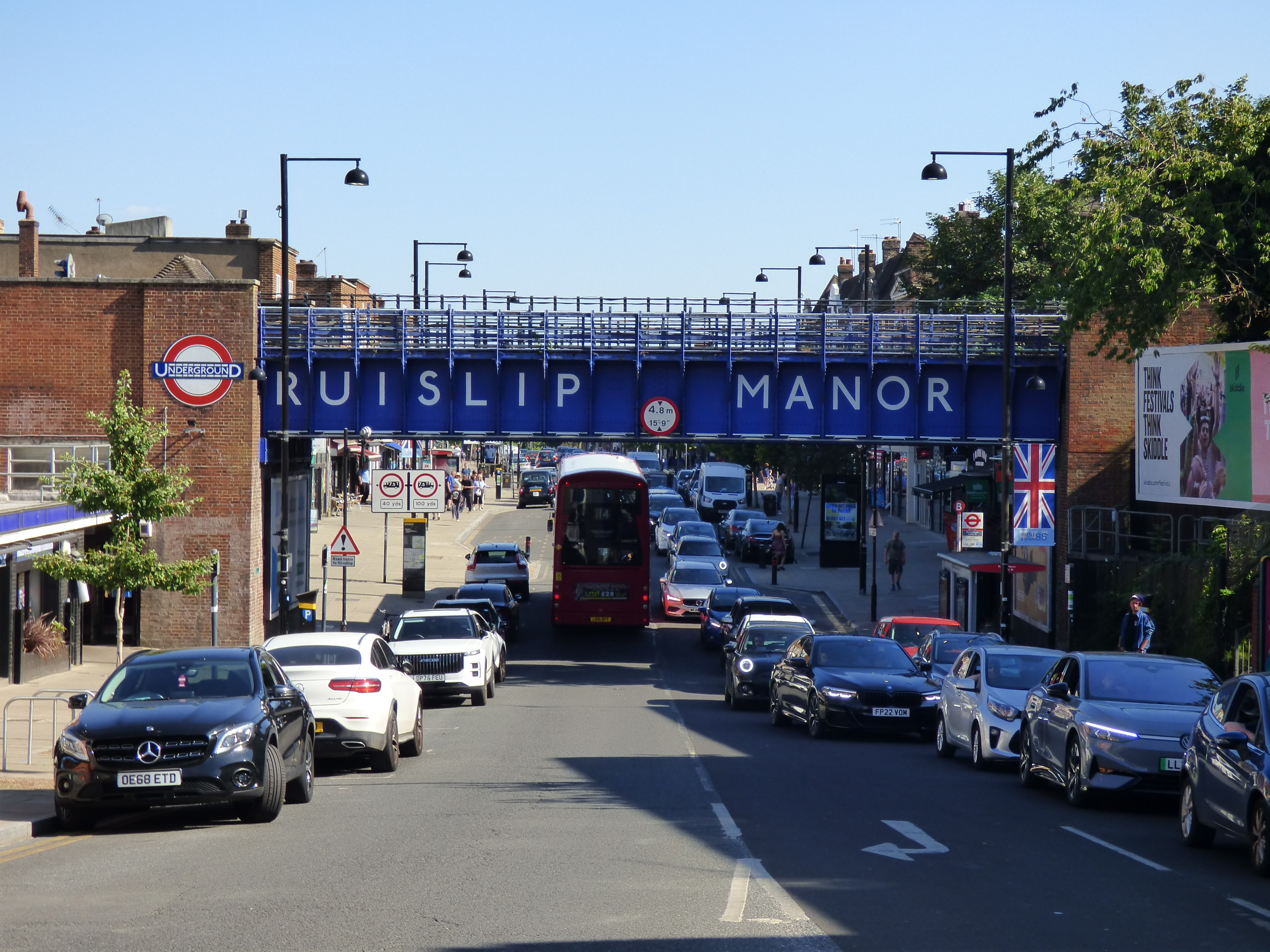
- Victoria Road, the main Ruislip Manor shopping parade

- Location within Greater London
- OS grid reference: TQ1086
  - Charing Cross: 13 mi (21 km) ESE
- London borough: Hillingdon
- Ceremonial county: Greater London
- Region: London
- Country: England
- Sovereign state: United Kingdom
- Post town: RUISLIP
- Postcode district: HA4
- Dialling code: 01895
- Police: Metropolitan
- Fire: London
- Ambulance: London
- UK Parliament: Uxbridge and South Ruislip
- London Assembly: Ealing and Hillingdon

Ruislip Manor is an area of Ruislip in the London Borough of Hillingdon in West London. It is located approximately 13 miles (20.9 km) west north west of Charing Cross.

The construction of a halt on the Metropolitan Railway in the area in 1912 led to the development of Ruislip Manor, on what was rural land.

== History ==
Ruislip Manor was originally owned by King's College, Cambridge, as a part of the Manor of Ruislip. At the turn of the 20th century, Ruislip Manor was undeveloped rural land until a halt was constructed in 1912 as part of the Metropolitan Railway running between Harrow and Uxbridge. George Ball later purchased 186 acres to the south of the railway line from King's College with construction of the new estate taking place between 1933 and 1939. Ball hoped the new housing would be available to the working man who wished to purchase his own home. The original plan under the "Manor Homes" name had been for 2,322 homes which Ball agreed would not number more than 14 per acre. The total number of houses was gradually reduced by 50 in 1934, then a further 35 in 1935, to allow the inclusion of Lady Bankes Primary School, St. Paul's Church and the Black Bull public house.

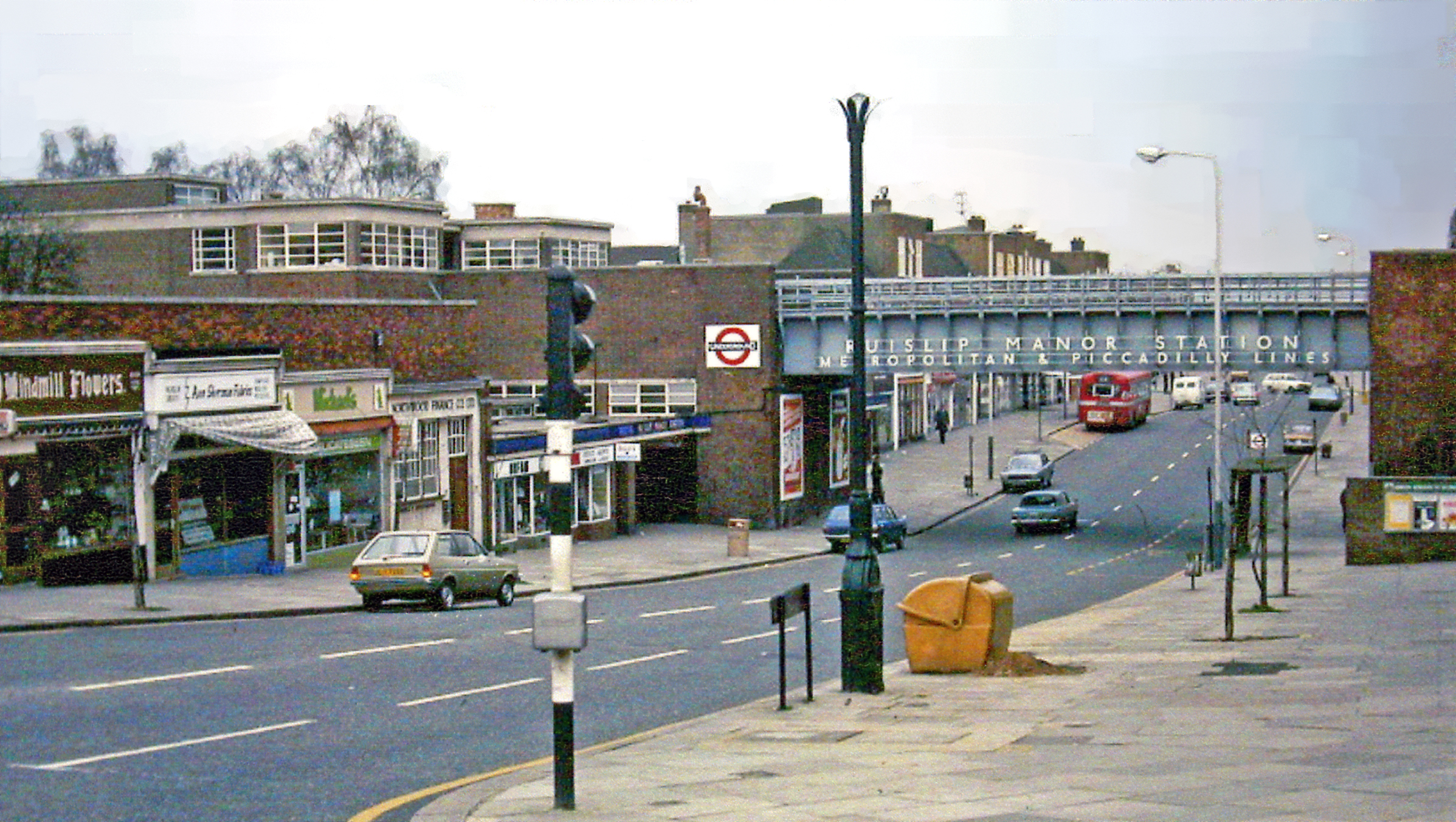
Ruislip Manor shops and tube station in 1978

The school was designed by the Middlesex County architect W.T. Curtis and the assistant architect for educational buildings, H. W. Burchett. A temporary school was opened by the Ruislip-Northwood Urban District Council on 17 October 1934 in the Victoria Hall. Lady Bankes school opened on 7 January 1936, named after Mary, Lady Bankes who had defended Corfe Castle from the Roundheads in the English Civil War.

The railway halt was later rebuilt as a station in 1938 and became Ruislip Manor tube station.

Along with surrounding areas, Ruislip Manor suffered from heavy aerial bombardment from the Luftwaffe during the Second World War because of its proximity to the fighter airfield RAF Northolt. Children from Bourne Junior School in South Ruislip were sent to Lady Bankes School after their school was requisitioned by the Royal Air Force. Some of the children from Lady Bankes were then accommodated at Sacred Heart School nearby. In 1972, a new school, Warrender Primary, was built on Windmill Hill.

In 2007, the London Borough of Hillingdon sold Ruislip Manor Library for redevelopment and rebuilt on the site of the Victoria Hall, as part of an investment programme for the borough's libraries. The new library opened in October 2007.

== Politics ==
Ruislip Manor is part of the Uxbridge and South Ruislip constituency for elections to the House of Commons.

Ruislip Manor is part of the Ruislip Manor ward for elections to Hillingdon London Borough Council.

== Notable people ==
- Daran Little, screenwriter
- Andy Serkis, actor
