= Eastcote tube station =

London Underground station

Eastcote
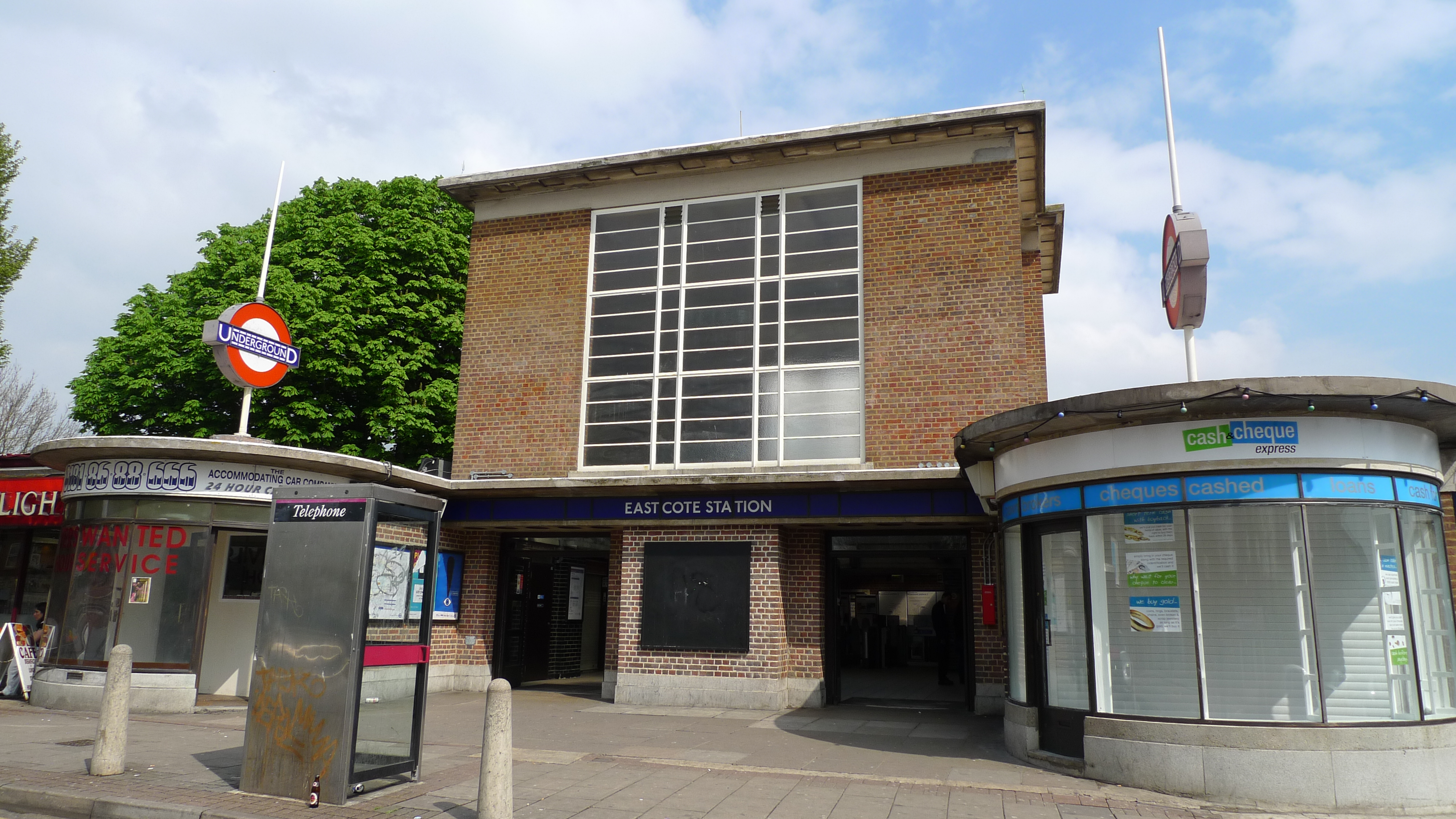
- Station entrance
- Interactive map of Eastcote

General information
- Location: Eastcote
- Local authority: London Borough of Hillingdon
- Managed by: London Underground
- Number of platforms: 2
- Fare zone: 5

London Underground annual entry and exit
- 2020: ▼1.37 million
- 2021: ▼1.19 million
- 2022: ▲1.99 million
- 2023: ▲2.16 million
- 2024: ▲2.21 million

Key dates
- 4 July 1904: Tracks laid (Metropolitan)
- 26 May 1906: Opened (Metropolitan)
- 1 March 1910: Start (District)
- 23 October 1933: End (District)
- 23 October 1933: Start (Piccadilly)
- 10 August 1964: Goods yard closed

Listed status
- Listing grade: II
- Entry number: 1358405
- Added to list: 17 May 1994; 32 years ago

Other information
- External links: TfL station info page
- Coordinates: 51.57667°N 0.39694°W

Eastcote is a London Underground station in Eastcote in West London. It is on the Uxbridge branches of both the Metropolitan and Piccadilly lines, between Ruislip Manor and Rayners Lane stations. The station is located on Field End Road. It is in London fare zone 5.

== History ==
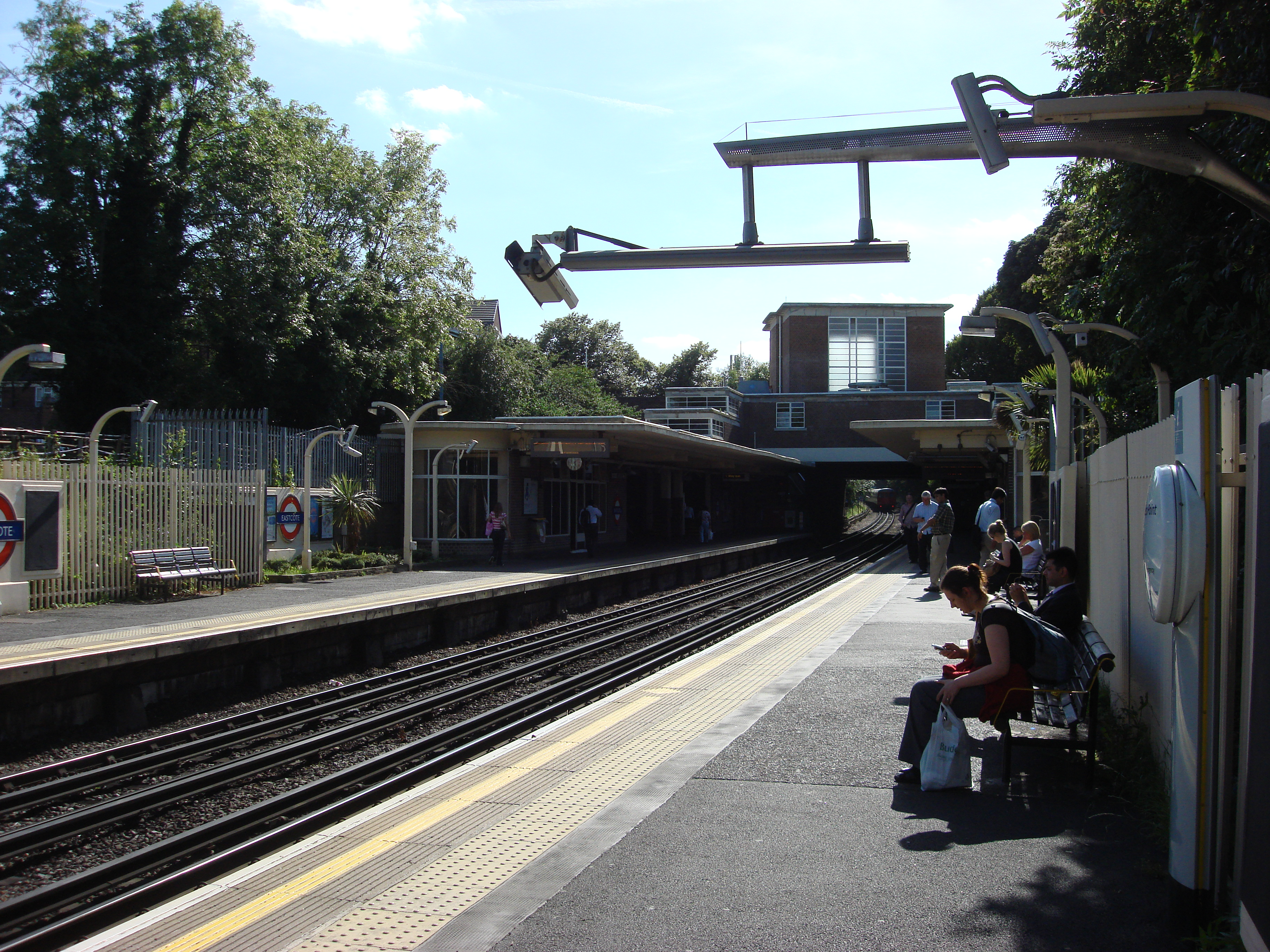
View of the eastbound platform

The Metropolitan Railway (Harrow and Uxbridge Railway) constructed the line between Harrow-on-the-Hill and Uxbridge and commenced services on 4 July 1904 with, initially, Ruislip being the only intermediate stop. At first, services were operated by steam trains, but track electrification was completed in the subsequent months and electric trains began operating on 1 January 1905.

Progressive development in the north Middlesex area over the next two decades led to the gradual opening of additional stations along the Uxbridge branch to encourage the growth of new residential areas. Eastcote opened on 26 May 1906 as Eastcote Halt.

On 1 March 1910, an extension of the District line from South Harrow to connect with the Metropolitan Railway at Rayners Lane was opened enabling District line trains to serve stations between Rayners Lane and Uxbridge from that date. On 23 October 1933 District line services were replaced by Piccadilly line trains. The station was rebuilt between 1937 and 1939 to a design by Charles Holden which features the large cube-shaped brick and glass ticket hall capped with a flat reinforced concrete roof and geometrical forms typical of the new stations built in this period. The station buildings and platforms are Grade II listed.

The station is surrounded by the suburb of Eastcote; the original centre, now known as Old Eastcote is some distance away. The Cavendish Pavilion nearby was a popular destination for outings in the first part of the twentieth century.

The tube station is currently not accessible for wheelchairs and buggies. In 2014, a campaign backed by paralympian Natasha Baker OBE backed a petition calling for step-free access in all Hillingdon stations including Eastcote and the issue was discussed by Hillingdon Council. At this time, a survey found that Eastcote had the second highest footfall in the Borough of Hillingdon, as well as high numbers of elderly residents and those with a long term disability. In 2023, a new petition calling for step-free access at Eastcote was backed by over 1000 residents. In 2023, Transport for London announced plans to review the potential for a lift at the station with the findings expected in late 2024.

== Services ==
Eastcote station is on the Uxbridge branches of both the Metropolitan and Piccadilly lines in London fare zone 5. It is between Ruislip Manor to the west and Rayners Lane to the east.

=== Metropolitan line ===
The Metropolitan line is the only line to operate an express service, though currently for Metropolitan line trains on the Uxbridge branch this is eastbound only in the morning peaks (06:30 to 09:30) Monday to Friday.

The off-peak service in trains per hour (tph) is:

- 8 tph Eastbound to Aldgate via Baker Street (all stations)
- 8 tph Westbound to Uxbridge

The morning peak service in trains per hour ( tph) is:

- 2 tph Eastbound to Aldgate via Baker Street (semi-fast)
- 4 tph Eastbound to Aldgate via Baker Street (all stations)
- 4 tph Eastbound to Baker Street (all stations)
- 10 tph Westbound to Uxbridge

The evening peak service in trains per hour ( tph) is:

- 7 tph Eastbound to Aldgate via Baker Street (all stations)
- 3 tph Eastbound to Baker Street (all stations)
- 10 tph Westbound to Uxbridge

=== Piccadilly line ===
Between Rayners Lane and Uxbridge there is no Piccadilly Line service before approximately 06:30 (Monday–Friday) and 08:45 (Saturday–Sunday), except for one early morning departure from Uxbridge at 05:18 (Monday–Saturday) and 06:46 (Sunday).

The off-peak service in trains per hour (tph) is:

- 3 tph Eastbound to Cockfosters
- 3 tph Westbound to Uxbridge

The peak time service in trains per hour (tph) is:

- 6 tph Eastbound to Cockfosters
- 6 tph Westbound to Uxbridge

Preceding station	London Underground	Following station
Ruislip Manor towards Uxbridge	Metropolitan line Uxbridge branch	Rayners Lane towards Baker Street or Aldgate
Ruislip Manor towards Uxbridge	Piccadilly line Uxbridge branch	Rayners Lane towards Cockfosters or Arnos Grove
Former services
Preceding station	London Underground	Following station
Ruislip Manor towards Uxbridge	District line (1910–1933)	Rayners Lane towards Upminster

== Connections ==
London Buses routes serve the station.
