= Harrow and Uxbridge Railway Act 1897 =

- Act of Parliament
- Parliament of the United Kingdom
- Long title: An Act for incorporating the Harrow and Uxbridge Railway Company, and authorising them to construct a Railway in the County of Middlesex, and for other purposes.
- Citation: 60 & 61 Vict. c. cclvi

Dates
- Royal assent: 6 August 1897

Text of statute as originally enacted

The Harrow and Uxbridge Railway Act 1897 (60 & 61 Vict. c. cclvi) was enabling legislation to allow the creation of the Harrow and Uxbridge Railway. It received royal assent on 6 August 1897.
