= Metropolitan line =

London Underground line

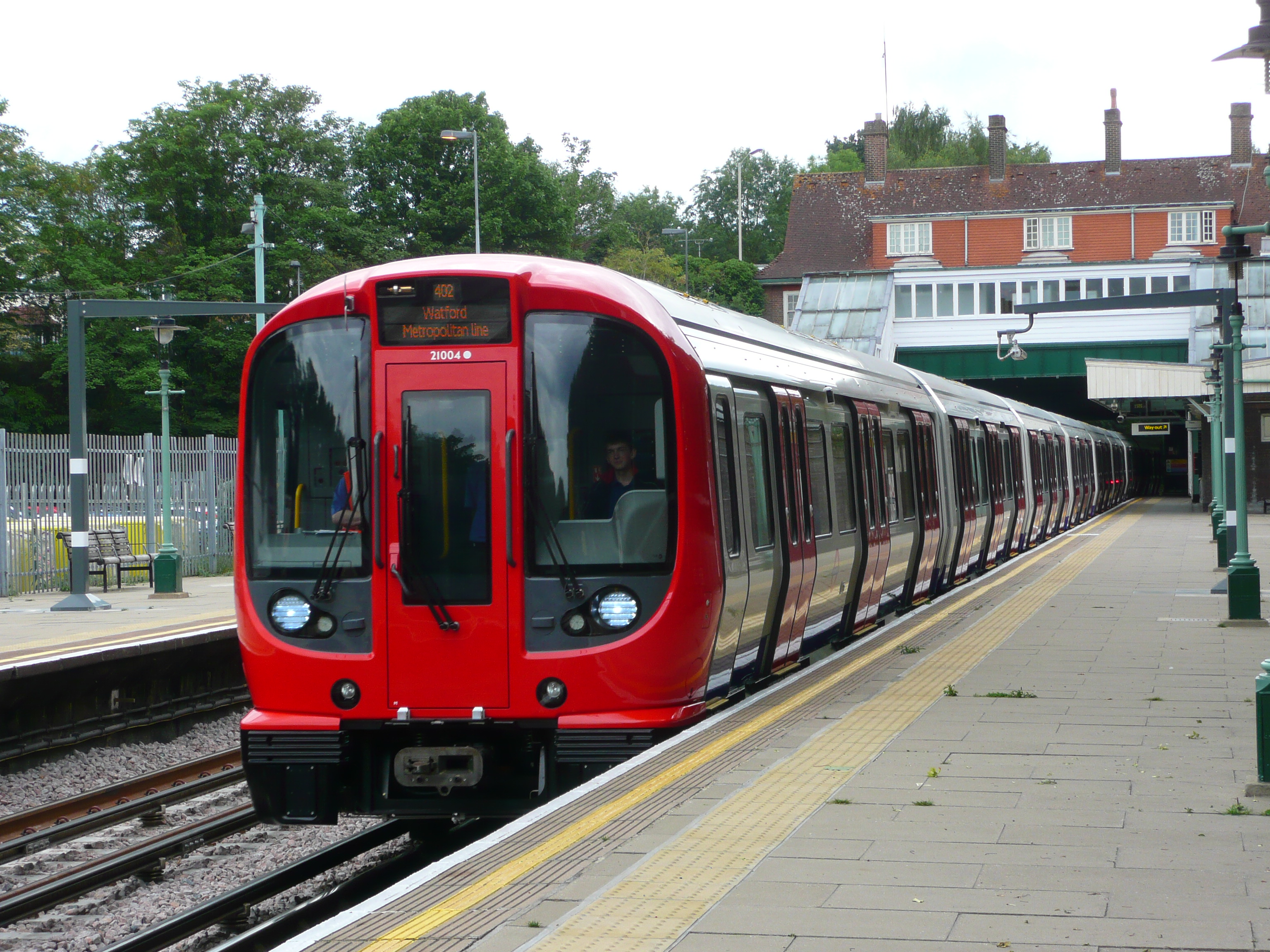
- A northbound S8 Stock Metropolitan line train at Croxley heading to Watford

Overview
- Termini: Baker Street, Aldgate; Uxbridge, Watford, Chesham, Amersham
- Stations: 34 (10 step free)
- Colour on map: Magenta
- Website: tfl.gov.uk/tube/route/metropolitan

Service
- Type: Rapid transit; suburban rail
- System: London Underground
- Depot: Neasden
- Rolling stock: S8 Stock
- Ridership: 93.670 million (2019) passenger journeys

History
- Opened: 10 January 1863; 163 years ago
- Last extension: 1925

Technical
- Line length: 67 km (42 mi)
- Num of tracks: 2, except: 4 Wembley Park–Moor Park; 1 Chalfont & Latimer–Chesham
- Character: Sub-surface
- Track gauge: 1,435 mm (4 ft 8 1/2 in) standard gauge
- Electrification: Fourth rail, 750 V DC
- Operating speed: 62 mph (100 km/h) maximum
Transport for London rail lines
London Underground
Bakerloo
Central
Circle
District
Hammersmith & City
Jubilee
Metropolitan
Northern
Piccadilly
Victoria
Waterloo & City
London Overground
Liberty
Lioness
Mildmay
Suffragette
Weaver
Windrush
Other TfL Modes
DLR
Elizabeth line
London Trams

The Metropolitan line, colloquially known as the Met, is a London Underground line between Aldgate in the City of London and Amersham and Chesham in Buckinghamshire, with branches to Watford in Hertfordshire and Uxbridge in Hillingdon. Printed in magenta on the tube map, the line is 41.4 miles (66.7 km) long and serves 34 stations. Between Aldgate and Finchley Road, the track lies mostly in shallow "cut and cover" tunnels, apart from short sections at Barbican and Farringdon stations. The rest of the line is above ground, with a loading gauge similar to those of main lines. Almost 94 million passenger journeys were made on the line in 2019.

This line is one of two Underground lines that cross the Greater London boundary and proceed outwards into the Home Counties, the other being the Central line. It is the only Underground line with an express service at peak times; the longer distance between stations means trains can achieve the system's highest speeds, up to 62 miles per hour (100 km/h), on some sections.

In 1863, the Metropolitan Railway was the world's first underground railway. It first ran between Paddington and Farringdon, with wooden carriages and steam locomotives, subsequently extending north-westwards into the Middlesex countryside, where it stimulated the development of new suburbs. Harrow was reached in 1880, and ultimately the line continued as far as Verney Junction, in Buckinghamshire, more than 50 miles (80 km) from Baker Street. From the end of the 19th century, the railway shared tracks with the Great Central Railway out of Marylebone. The central London lines were electrified by 1907, but electric locomotives were exchanged for steam locomotives on trains heading north of Harrow. After the railway was absorbed by the London Passenger Transport Board in 1933, the line was cut back to Aylesbury. Steam trains ran until 1961, when the line was electrified to, and services were curtailed at, Amersham. The Hammersmith & City line was shown on the tube map as a part of the Metropolitan line until 1990, when it appeared as a separate line. The current S8 Stock trains entered service between 2010 and 2012, replacing the A Stock trains, which had served since 1961.

The section between Aldgate and Baker Street is shared with the Circle line; between Liverpool Street and Baker Street with the Hammersmith & City line; between Rayners Lane and Uxbridge with the Piccadilly line; and between Harrow-on-the-Hill and Amersham with the London–Aylesbury line operated by Chiltern Railways. Baker Street is the southbound terminus for some trains not continuing to Aldgate. Most of the route has two tracks, except for the single-track Chesham branch and a four-track section between Wembley Park and Moor Park, which allows fast and semi-fast services to overtake "all stations" trains. There are four tracks between Wembley Park and Finchley Road: only the outer ones are used by the Metropolitan line's non-stop trains; the inner pair was transferred to the Bakerloo line in 1939 (and became the Jubilee line in 1979) with services calling at all stations.

== History ==
=== Metropolitan Railway ===
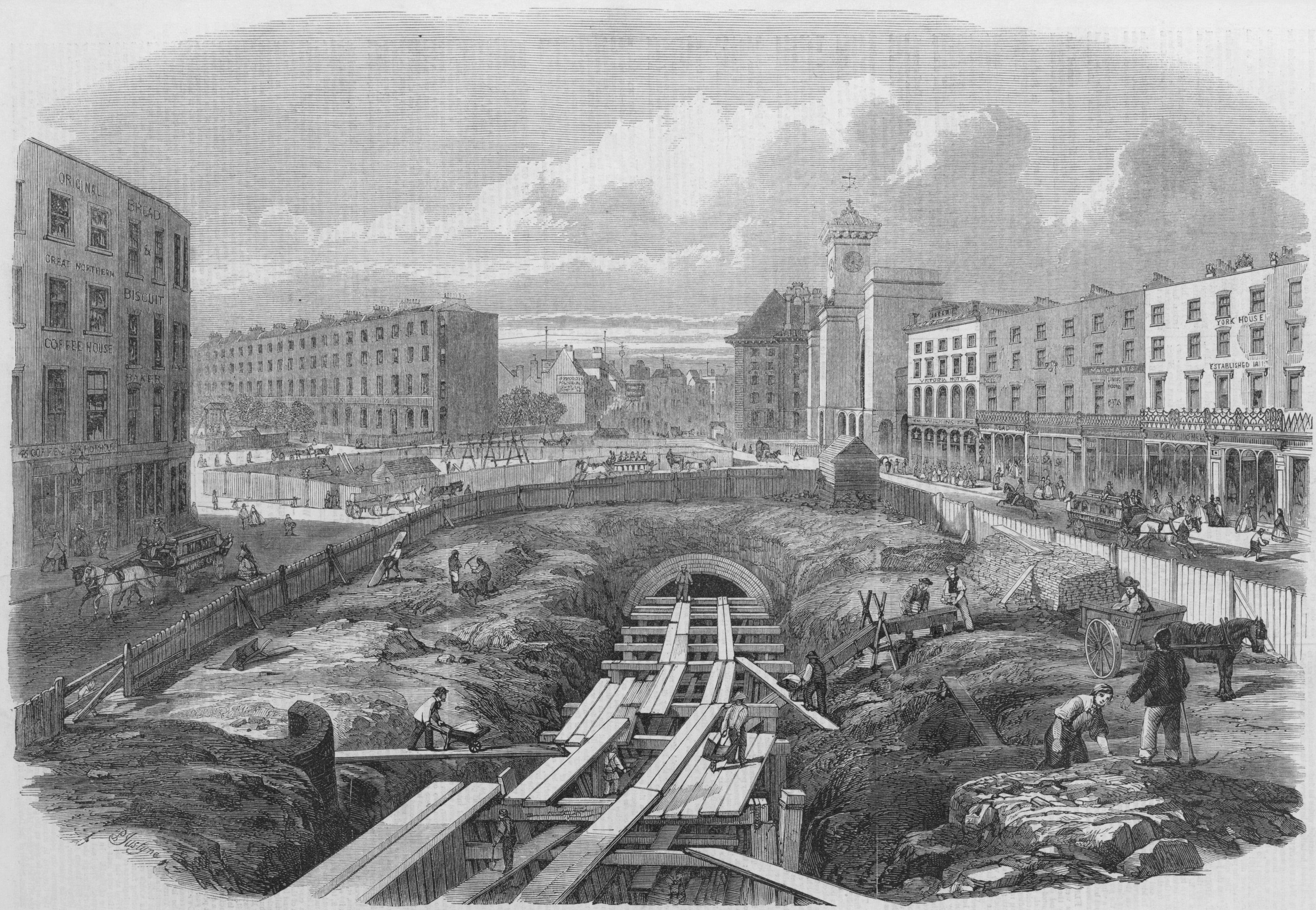
Construction of the Metropolitan line near King's Cross station (1861)

The Metropolitan Railway, also known as the Met, was a passenger and goods railway that served London from 1863 to 1933, its main line heading north-west from the City to what were to become the Middlesex suburbs. Its first line connected the mainline railway termini at Paddington, Euston and King's Cross to the City, built beneath the New Road using the cut-and-cover method between Paddington and King's Cross, and in tunnel and cuttings beside Farringdon Road from King's Cross to near Smithfield. The world's first underground railway, it opened on 10 January 1863 with gas-lit wooden carriages hauled by steam locomotives. The line operated at a frequency of three trains per hour, rising to four trains per hour during the peak periods. In the 1871 plans for an underground railway in Paris, it was called the Métropolitain.

The railway was soon extended from both ends and northwards via a branch from Baker Street. It reached Hammersmith in 1864 and Richmond in 1877; it completed the Inner Circle in 1884, but the most important route became the line west and north-west into the Middlesex countryside, where it stimulated the development of new suburbs. Harrow was reached in 1880, and ultimately, as far as Verney Junction in Buckinghamshire, more than 50 miles (80 kilometres) from Baker Street. From the end of the 19th century, the railway shared tracks with the Great Central Railway route out of Marylebone.

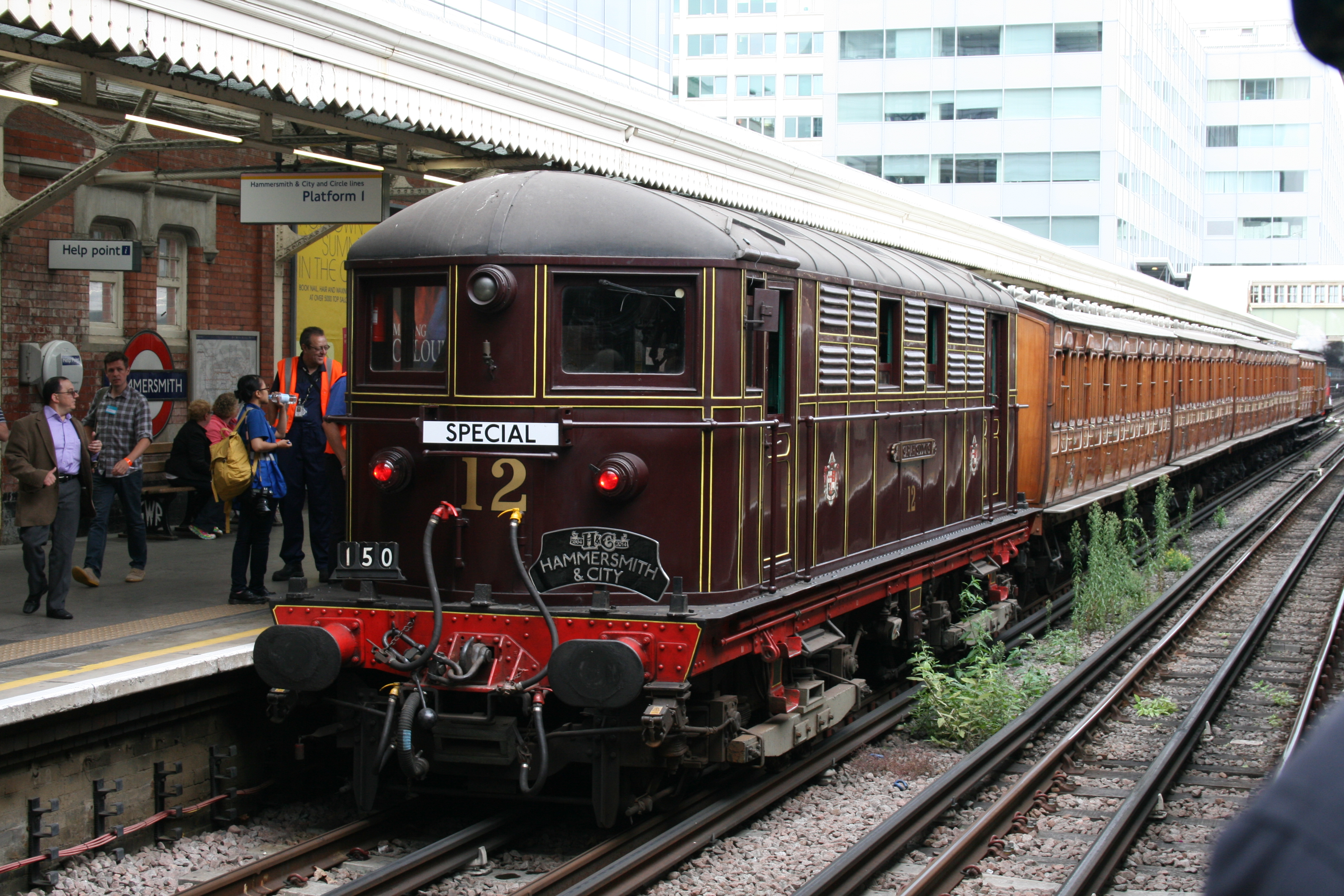
12 Sarah Siddons with vintage train at Hammersmith

Electric traction was introduced in 1905 with electric multiple units operating between Uxbridge, Harrow-on-the-Hill and Baker Street. To remove steam and smoke from the tunnels in central London, the railway purchased electric locomotives, exchanged for steam locomotives at Harrow from 1908. In 1910, a seventeen-minute silent film was made showing large portions of the journey from Baker Street to Aylesbury and Uxbridge, seen from the cab of a train.

Unlike other railways in the London area, the Met developed land for housing, thus benefitting from the increase in the value of its land caused by the building of the railway. After World War I it promoted its housing estates near the railway with the "Metro-land" brand.

To improve services, more powerful electric and steam locomotives were purchased in the 1920s. A short branch opened from Rickmansworth to Watford in 1925. After World War I, the 4-mile (6.4 km) Stanmore branch was built from Wembley Park.

=== London Transport ===
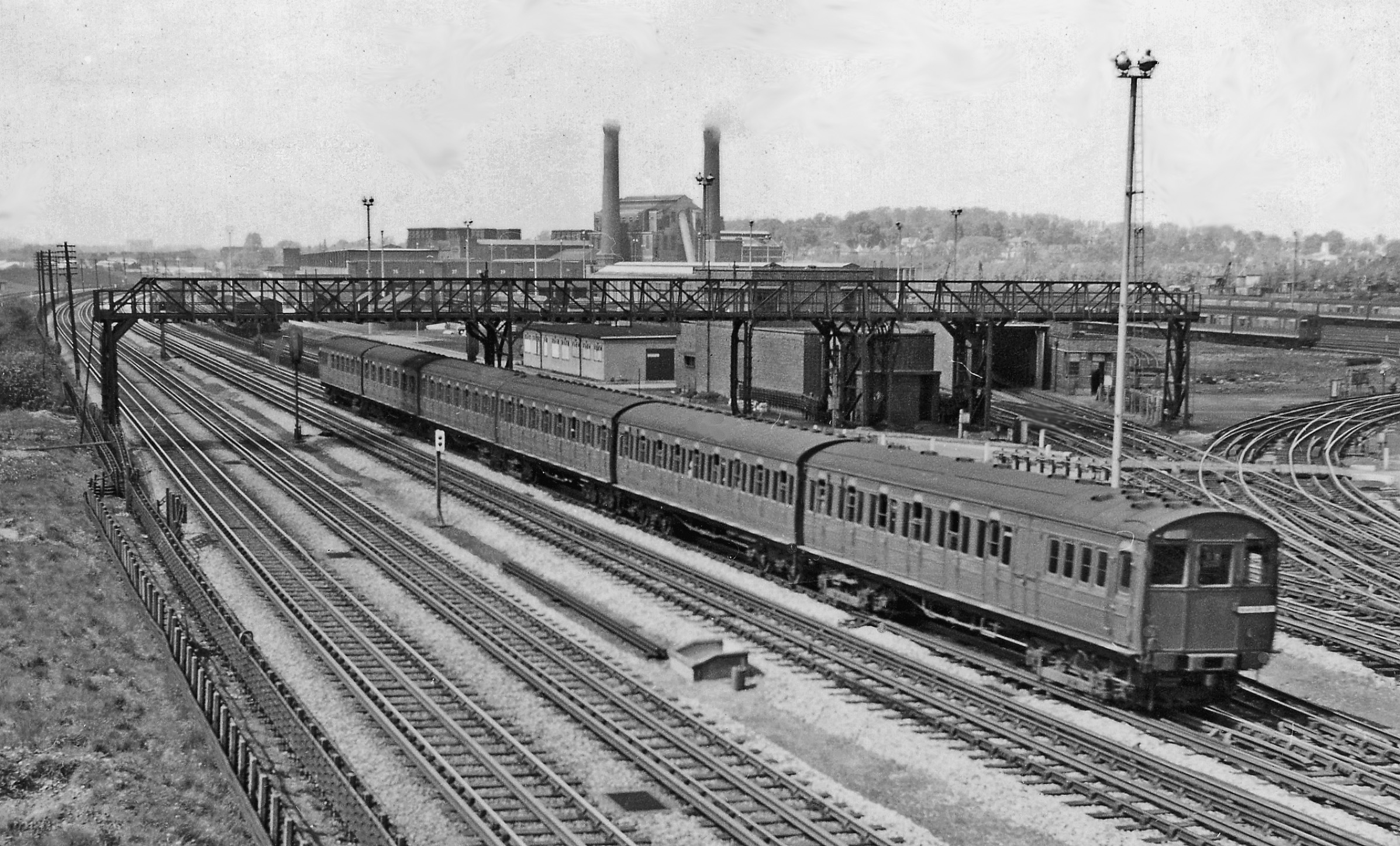
T Stock train passing Neasden Depot in 1959

On 1 July 1933, the Metropolitan was amalgamated with other Underground railways, tramway companies and bus operators to form the London Passenger Transport Board, and a period of rationalisation followed.

While the Metropolitan was run as an outer suburban route with steam-hauled trains and goods services, the LPTB wished to focus on electrified trains and suburban traffic. Goods services were passed to the London and North Eastern Railway, which also took over the role of providing steam locomotives for trains beyond the end of electrification at Rickmansworth. All services north-west of Aylesbury were withdrawn by 1936 though services returned to Quainton Road between 1943 and 1948.

The 1930s was a period of rapid growth for the north-western suburbs of London, and LPTB developed ambitious plans to simplify the Metropolitan line and expand capacity. Several stations on the Uxbridge branch were rebuilt, replacing temporary wooden buildings with modernist designs and giving Uxbridge station a new site in the town centre. A major bottleneck in the line, the double-track tunnel from Baker Street to Finchley Road, was bypassed by boring two tube tunnels underneath the Metropolitan tunnels, transferring slow services and the Stanmore branch to the Bakerloo line. (This route was transferred to the Jubilee line in 1979.) In 1936, the line was extended east from Whitechapel to Barking along the tracks of the District line. London Transport inherited incompatible electric multiple units from the railway, including the 1927–33 multiple-unit compartment stock used on routes to Watford and Rickmansworth, and these were refurbished to form a uniform fleet and designated London Underground T Stock. In the 1950s, F Stock trains, with sliding doors under the control of the guard, were transferred from the District line; these mainly worked the semi-fast Harrow and Uxbridge services.

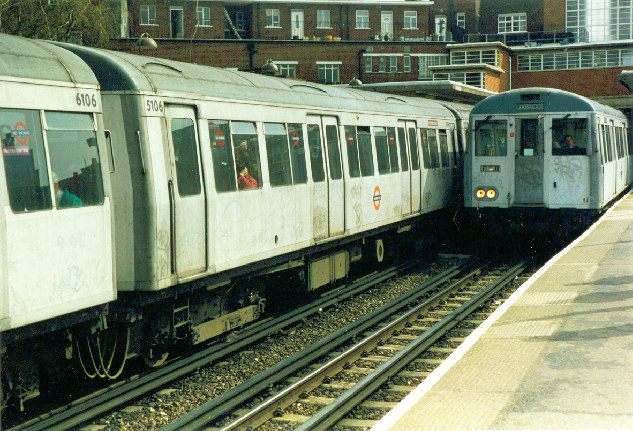
A Stock vehicles at Rayners Lane in their original unpainted livery

A major rebuilding of the main line from Wembley Park to Amersham was planned in the 1930s but delayed by the war. The line from Wembley to Harrow was rebuilt immediately after the war and the project was completed from 1956 to 1962, on a more modest scale than originally planned. Until 1961, passenger trains continued to be attached to a steam locomotive at Rickmansworth to run to Aylesbury. The rebuilding electrified the line from Rickmansworth to Amersham, transferring all Aylesbury services to British Railways. A pair of fast lines was added from Harrow to north of Moor Park by 1962, allowing outer-suburban trains to run fast to Moor Park. Aluminium A stock, originally unpainted, replaced the T stock and locomotive-hauled trains. More A Stock trains were built in 1962–63 to replace the trains on the Uxbridge service, giving the main line a single train type for all services. A Stock was four-car units that could operate as four- or eight-car trains; normally operated as eight cars, a four-car unit operated the Chesham shuttle. One person operation of the trains was proposed in 1972, but due to conflict with the trade unions was not introduced on the line until 1986.

=== A separate identity ===
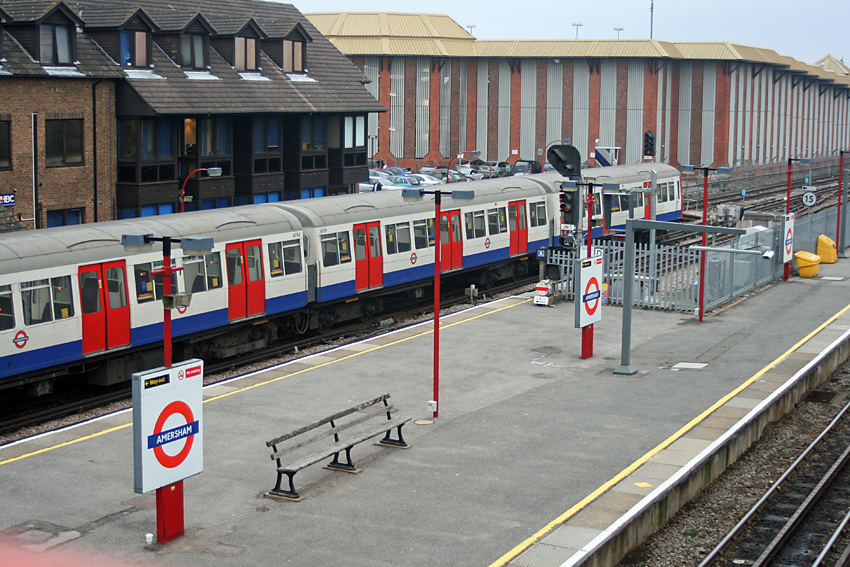
A stock at Amersham

Although the East London line had been an isolated shuttle since 1939, it was shown on London Underground maps as part of the Metropolitan line until 1968. In 1970, it was shown with a thin white line in the middle and labelled the "East London section". By the 1985 map, it had become the "East London Line", remaining the same colour as the Metropolitan line with a white line in the middle, changed to orange by the 1990 map. In 1990, the Hammersmith & City line became a separate line from Hammersmith to Whitechapel (Barking during the peak), the Metropolitan line being from Aldgate to Baker Street and northwards to Amersham with branches to Chesham, Uxbridge and Watford.

In 2003, the infrastructure was partly privatised in a public–private partnership managed by the Metronet consortium. Metronet entered administration in 2007 and Transport for London took over responsibilities.

On 12 December 2010, the service to Amersham was reduced from four trains per hour to two, and a direct service between Chesham and central London was introduced, replacing the 4-car Chesham to Chalfont & Latimer shuttle. The final passenger services operated by the A Stock ran on 26 September 2012, followed by a ticketed public railtour on 29 September.

== Route ==
=== Map ===
The route of the Metropolitan line

The Metropolitan line is 41.6 miles (67 km) long and serves 34 stations. It is electrified with a four-rail DC system: a central conductor rail is energised at –250 V and a rail outside the running rail at +500 V, giving a potential difference of 750 V, except for the section from Uxbridge to Finchley Road (via Harrow-on-the-Hill) which is energised at –210 V and +420 V respectively (630 V potential difference) to maintain compatibility with 1973 Stock and 1996 Stock that runs in those areas. The first 6 miles (9.7 km) from Aldgate are below ground, shared with the Circle and Hammersmith & City lines to Baker Street, where the line diverges, remaining in tunnel until Finchley Road. Metropolitan line trains essentially skip two stops between Baker Street and Finchley Road, with the Jubilee line serving the intermediate stations on an adjacent parallel line. The Jubilee line then joins the Metropolitan line in the same right-of-way at Finchley Road. Metropolitan line trains then run express from Finchley Road to Wembley Park, with the Jubilee line serving the intermediate stations. Metropolitan line platforms at Willesden Green and Neasden remain for emergency use. At Wembley Park the Jubilee line diverges to the Stanmore branch at a grade-separated junction. From just after Finchley Road, these four tracks run parallel with the Network Rail Chiltern Main Line from Marylebone.

Between Wembley Park and Harrow-on-the-Hill, the Metropolitan is four-track, with fast and slow lines paired by direction, paralleling the two-track un-electrified London–Aylesbury line. The slow lines are between the fast lines, and the two intermediate stations have island platforms. Harrow-on-the-Hill has platforms on all six lines. The central slow lines diverge here at a grade-separated junction to become the 7.5 miles (12.1 km) Uxbridge branch. After West Harrow, at Rayners Lane the line is joined by the Piccadilly line, which shares the tracks to Uxbridge; a turnback siding allows some Piccadilly line services to terminate at Rayners Lane.

On the main line between Harrow-on-the-Hill and Moor Park, the line is four-track, paired by use. The western fast tracks are shared with Aylesbury line services from Marylebone; the eastern slow tracks have platforms at the intermediate stations.

North of Moor Park, the Watford branch diverges from the slow lines. This double-track branch has stations at Croxley and Watford. The Watford branch has a triangle junction with the main line, with a north-facing curve between Croxley and Rickmansworth. This route, Watford North Curve, is used daily for a few services and empty stock movements.

From the Watford triangle to Amersham, the line has two tracks. At Chalfont & Latimer, the 3.89 miles (6.26 km) single-track Chesham branch diverges, running parallel to the main line for a distance. The Metropolitan line ends at Amersham, where there are turnback sidings just beyond the platforms. The route continues to Aylesbury with Chiltern Railways trains only.

The fast (non-stopping) lines between Wembley Park and Harrow on the Hill are signalled with LUL signalling, but using four-aspect Network Rail signal heads. The upper two lights are a two-aspect stop signal displaying either a green or red aspect, the lower two lights a repeater signal for the next stop signal ahead showing a green or yellow aspect, or no aspect when the stop signal shows a red aspect. Thus they are effectively four-light three-aspect signals with green/red/green/yellow lights from the top, danger being a single red light, caution the top green light over a yellow light, and clear two green lights.

The Metropolitan line's suburban rail character opposed to other London Underground lines is also shown by the long distances between stops. Eight of the top 10 furthest apart stations on the Underground are on the Metropolitan line. The section between Chalfont & Latimer and Chesham is the longest at 3.9 miles (6.3 km), whilst the Finchley Road to Wembley Park section is the second longest, and Rickmansworth to Chorleywood the fourth longest overall.

== Services ==
The Metropolitan line is the only London Underground line to operate non-stop services through some of its stations, although since 11 December 2011 these only run on weekdays during peak times (southbound in the morning peak, northbound in the evening peak). Depending on the stopping pattern, services are advertised as either all-stations, semi-fast or fast on platform information boards and on-train announcements. The stopping pattern of each type of service is as follows:

- All-stations services call at all stations en route
- Semi-fast services run non-stop between Wembley Park and Harrow-on-the-Hill, and call at all other stations en route
- Fast services run non-stop between Wembley Park and Harrow-on-the-Hill and between Harrow-on-the-Hill and Moor Park
- In the southbound direction, fast and semi-fast trains do not usually call at Wembley Park, and instead run non-stop from Harrow-on-the-Hill to Finchley Road

Owing to the track layout, fast services can only run to/from Amersham or Chesham. The Uxbridge branch diverges from the rest of the line before the "fast" section, while the Watford branch is not directly connected with the fast line at Moor Park.

No Metropolitan line trains call at any intermediate stations between Finchley Road and Wembley Park. These stations are served by the Jubilee line which runs parallel to the Metropolitan line along this section.

=== Frequency ===
During the off-peak the service pattern on the line, in trains per hour (tph), is as follows:

- 8 tph Aldgate - Uxbridge (all stations);
- 4 tph Baker Street - Watford (all stations);
- 2 tph Aldgate - Amersham (all stations);
- 2 tph Aldgate - Chesham (all stations).

These services combine to give a total frequency of 16{trains per hour between Baker Street and Harrow-on-the-Hill. Of these, 12 trains per hour run between Aldgate and Baker Street which, together with the six trains per hour frequencies on both the Circle and Hammersmith & City lines, gives a total of 24 trains every hour on the central-London section between Liverpool Street and Baker Street.

In the morning peak, the southbound service pattern is strengthened to the following:

- 4 tph Uxbridge - Baker Street (all stations);
- 6 tph Uxbridge - Aldgate (4 all stations, 2 semi-fast);
- 6 tph Watford - Baker Street (3 all stations, 3 semi-fast);
- 2 tph Watford - Aldgate (1 all stations, 1 semi-fast);
- 4 tph Amersham - Aldgate (2 semi-fast, 2 fast)
- 2 tph Chesham - Aldgate (fast).

The northbound frequencies in the morning peak are similar on each route, except most trains run as all-stations services.

Similarly, in the evening peak, the northbound service pattern is strengthened to the following:

- 3 tph Baker Street - Uxbridge (all stations);
- 7 tph Aldgate - Uxbridge (all stations);
- 4 tph Baker Street - Watford (2 all stations, 2 semi-fast)
- 4 tph Aldgate - Watford (semi-fast);
- 2 tph Baker Street - Amersham (semi-fast);
- 2 tph Aldgate - Amersham (fast);
- 2 tph Aldgate - Chesham (fast).

The southbound frequencies in the evening peak are similar on each route, except all trains run as all-stations services.

== Rolling stock ==
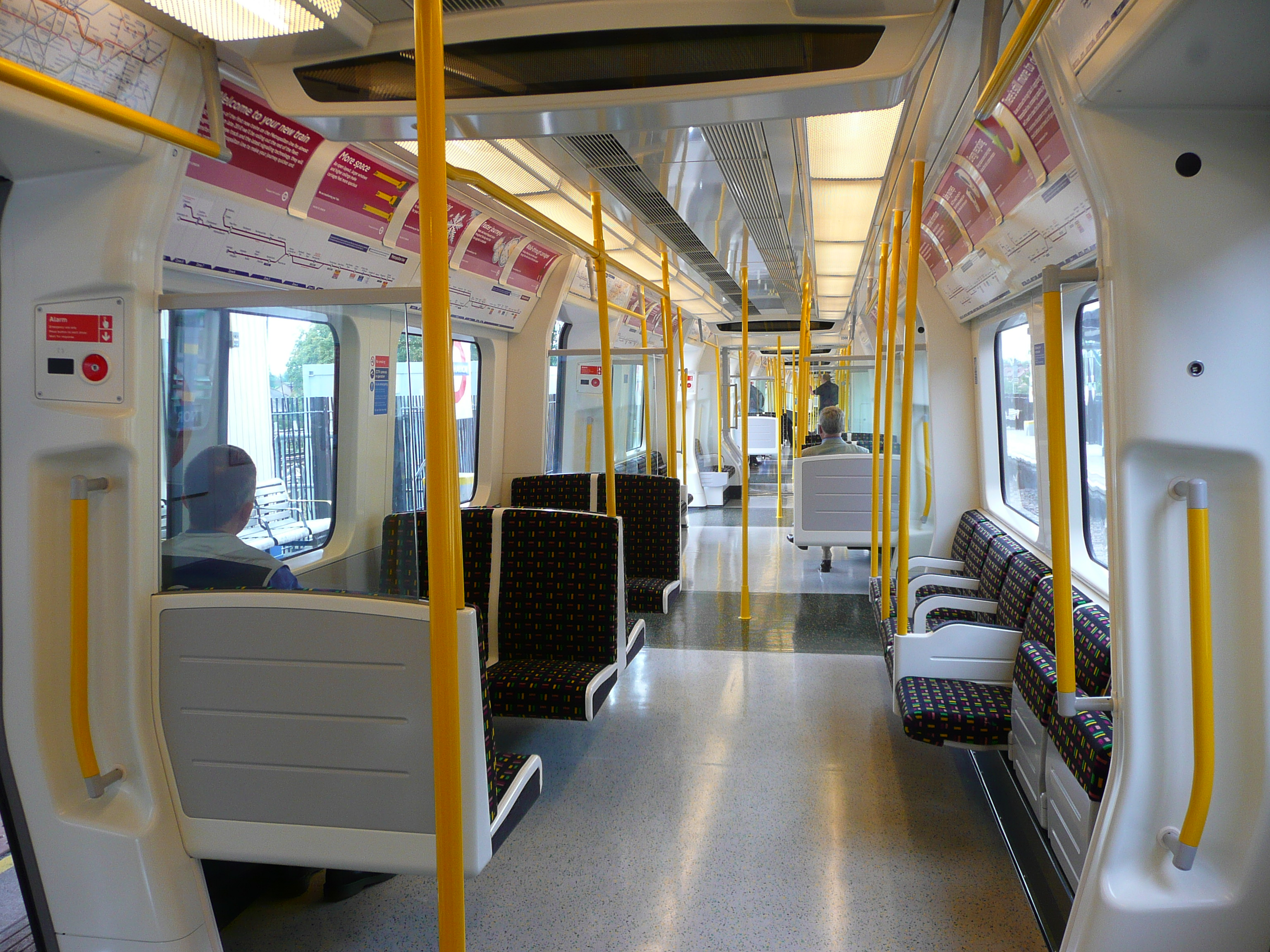
S8 Stock trains featuring partial transverse seating, reminiscent of the older A Stock trains

Since 20 September 2012, all services have been provided by eight-car S Stock trains introduced in July 2010 to replace the 1960s A Stock. Part of Bombardier's Movia family, they have air-conditioning, feasible because the sub-surface tunnels, unlike tube tunnels, are able to disperse the exhausted hot air. They have regenerative brakes, returning around 20% of their energy to the network and thus reducing energy consumption. With fewer seats than the older A Stock – 306 compared with 448 – they can accommodate 697 standing passengers, compared with 597 in A Stock, (Note: Based on 4 passengers per square metre.) and have dedicated space for wheelchairs. They have a top speed of 62 miles per hour (100 km/h), being the only London Underground stock to travel at that speed, doing so on the long-distance sections north of Finchley Road.

There are 58 S8 Stock trains in operation, as well as one eight-car S7 Stock also called 'S7+1' – which retains the all-longitudinal seating of the normal seven-car S7 Stock that is operated on London Underground's other sub-surface lines.

== Depot ==
The line is served by a depot at Neasden. (Note: Position: 51°33′28″N 000°15′31″W) The Metropolitan Railway opened a carriage works at Neasden in 1882 and the following year the locomotive works were moved from Edgware Road. In 1904–05, the depot was refitted to take the new electric multiple units and accommodation enlarged in 1932–3. After the amalgamation into the LTPB, the depot was rebuilt from 1936 to 1939. The depot was upgraded in 2010–11 to enable it to maintain S Stock trains. Trains are also stored overnight at Uxbridge, Watford, Rickmansworth and Wembley Park.

== Steam on the Met ==
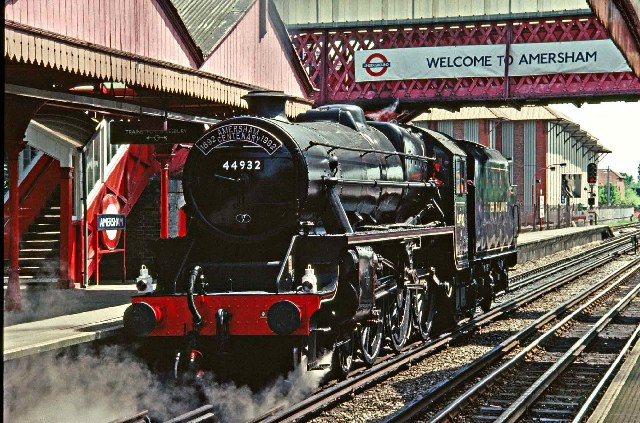
LMS Black 5 44932 at Amersham in 1992

In 1989, to celebrate the 100th anniversary of the opening of the Metropolitan to Chesham, the first Steam on the Met event took place with London Underground running two weekends of steam specials between Chesham and Watford. The event was a success and so in 1990 London Underground ran steam between Harrow and Amersham. In 1992, to celebrate 100 years of the Met at Amersham, the event was extended to five days at the end of May. From 1994, diesel locomotive 20227, owned by the Class 20 Locomotive Society, and electric locomotive Sarah Siddons provided air braking for the coaches. In 1995, trains ran between Amersham and Watford.

Engines used included BR standard class 5 and BR standard class 4 and GWR Pannier tanks. There was other rolling stock on static display at Rickmansworth sidings. The steam trains ran between normal Metropolitan and main line services. Due to the imminent partial privatisation of LUL and the stock condition, the last steam excursion took place in 2000. In 2008, special trains ran on using Metropolitan Railway electric locomotive "Sarah Siddons" and diesel Class 20 locomotives.

To celebrate the 150th anniversary of the opening of the Metropolitan, special services ran in January 2013 using a restored 1892 "Jubilee" carriage, 1898–1900 Ashbury and Cravens bogie carriages, Metropolitan Railway milk van No.3, Metropolitan Railway E Class steam locomotive No. 1 and electric locomotive Sarah Siddons. Further events were planned for 2013 involving Locomotive No. 1, Sarah Siddons and the Jubilee carriage, including a Steam back on the Met scheduled for May.

== Four Lines Modernisation (4LM) ==
It was planned that a new signalling system would be used first on the line north of Baker Street from the end of 2016, but signalling contractor Bombardier was released from its contract by agreement in December 2013 amid heavy criticism of the procurement process and London Underground subsequently awarded the contract for the project to Thales in August 2015.

With the introduction of S8 Stock, the track, electrical supply, and signalling systems are being upgraded in a programme planned to increase peak-hour capacity on the line by 27 per cent by the end of 2023. A single control room for the sub-surface railway opened at Hammersmith on 6 May 2018, and communications-based train control (CBTC) provided by Thales will progressively replace 'fixed block' signalling equipment dating back the 1940s. Trackside signals with automatic train protection (ATP) will remain on the line north of Harrow-on-the-Hill, shared with Chiltern Railways DMUs.

The rollout of CBTC has been split into sections, each known as a signal migration area (SMA).

Metropolitan line signal migration areas
SMA (Note: SMAs 0.5, 1, 4–7 and 10–12 concern parts of the District, Circle, and Hammersmith & City lines.)	from	to	status	date
2	Finchley Road	Euston Square	completed	September 2019
3	Euston Square	Aldgate	completed	July 2020
8	Finchley Road	Preston Road	completed	June 2025
9	Preston Road	West Harrow; Moor Park	planned	2nd half-2026 (TBC)
13	Moor Park	Watford; Amersham; Chesham	planned	2nd half 2027 (TBC)
14	West Harrow	Uxbridge	planned	2028 (TBC)

Work on the SMAs north of Finchley Road were delayed in November 2023 because of the complexity of Neasden Depot (shared with the Jubilee Line) and challenges relating to the inter-operability with Chiltern Railways which shares tracks with the Metropolitan line in this area.

== List of stations ==
=== Open stations ===
In order from east to west.

Station	Image	Opened	Branch	Additional information	Position
Aldgate		18 November 1876	Main line	Terminus. Connects with Circle line.	51°30′50″N 000°04′34″W
Liverpool Street		12 July 1875	Main line	Originally Bishopsgate, renamed 1 November 1909. Interchange for Central and Hammersmith & City lines and Weaver line, Elizabeth line and National Rail services from Liverpool Street mainline station.	51°31′07″N 000°04′53″W..
Moorgate		23 December 1865	Main line	Originally Moorgate Street, renamed 24 October 1924. Interchange for Northern line and National Rail services on the Northern City Line. Interchange for Elizabeth line via Liverpool Street Station.	51°31′07″N 000°05′19″W.
Barbican		23 December 1865	Main line	Originally Aldersgate Street, renamed Aldersgate 1910, Aldersgate and Barbican 1923, Barbican 1968.	51°31′13″N 000°05′52″W
Farringdon		10 January 1863	Main line	Resited 22 December 1865. Originally Farringdon Street, renamed Farringdon & High Holborn 1922, Farringdon 1936. Interchange for National Rail and Elizabeth line services.	51°31′12″N 000°06′19″W
King's Cross St Pancras		10 January 1863	Main line	Station resited 1941. Originally King's Cross, renamed King's Cross & St Pancras 1925, King's Cross St Pancras 1933. Interchange for Northern, Piccadilly and Victoria lines, National Rail services and Eurostar.	51°31′49″N 000°07′27″W
Euston Square		10 January 1863	Main line	Originally Gower Street, renamed 1909.	51°31′33″N 000°08′09″W
Great Portland Street		10 January 1863	Main line	Originally Portland Road, renamed Great Portland Street 1917, Great Portland Street & Regent's Park 1923, Great Portland Street 1933.	51°31′26″N 000°08′38″W
Baker Street		10 January 1863	Main line	Metropolitan line platforms date from 1868. Interchange for Bakerloo, Circle, Hammersmith & City and Jubilee lines.	51°31′19″N 000°09′25″W
Finchley Road		30 June 1879	Main line	Finchley Road (South Hampstead) from 1885 to 1914. Connects with Jubilee line.	51°32′50″N 000°10′49″W
Wembley Park		12 May 1894	Main line	Connects with Jubilee line.	51°33′49″N 000°16′46″W
Preston Road		21 May 1908	Main line	Resited 1931–32.	51°34′20″N 000°17′43″W
Northwick Park		28 June 1923	Main line	Originally Northwick Park & Kenton, renamed 1937.	51°34′43″N 000°19′07″W
Harrow-on-the-Hill		2 August 1880	Main line	Originally Harrow, renamed 1894. Interchange for National Rail services.	51°34′46″N 000°20′13″W
West Harrow		17 November 1913	Uxbridge		51°34′47″N 000°21′12″W
Rayners Lane		26 May 1906	Uxbridge	Connects with Piccadilly line.	51°34′31″N 000°22′17″W
Eastcote		26 May 1906	Uxbridge		51°34′36″N 000°23′49″W
Ruislip Manor		5 August 1912	Uxbridge		51°34′24″N 000°24′45″W
Ruislip		4 July 1904	Uxbridge		51°34′17″N 000°25′16″W
Ickenham		25 September 1905	Uxbridge	Originally Ickenham Halt, rebuilt 1970–71.	51°33′43″N 000°26′31″W
Hillingdon		10 December 1923	Uxbridge	Renamed Hillingdon (Swakeleys) 1934, suffix gradually dropped. Resited and rebuilt 1992.	51°33′14″N 000°27′00″W
Uxbridge		4 July 1904	Uxbridge	Terminus. Station resited from Belmont Road in 1938.	51°32′45″N 000°28′42″W
North Harrow		22 March 1915	Main line		51°35′06″N 000°21′45″W
Pinner		25 May 1885	Main line		51°35′34″N 000°22′50″W
Northwood Hills		13 November 1933	Main line		51°36′02″N 000°24′33″W
Northwood		1 September 1887	Main line	The last station within Greater London.	51°36′39″N 000°25′28″W
Moor Park		9 May 1910	Main line	Originally Sandy Lodge, renamed Moor Park & Sandy Lodge 18 October 1923, Moor Park 25 September 1950.	51°37′47″N 000°25′58″W
Croxley		2 November 1925	Watford	Originally Croxley Green, renamed 23 May 1949.	51°38′51″N 000°26′29″W
Watford		2 November 1925	Watford	Terminus.	51°39′27″N 000°25′03″W
Rickmansworth		1 September 1887	Main line		51°38′25″N 000°28′24″W
Chorleywood		8 July 1889	Main line	The last station within Hertfordshire. Originally Chorley Wood, renamed Chorley Wood & Chenies 1 November 1915, Chorley Wood 1934, Chorleywood 1964.	51°39′15″N 000°31′06″W
Chalfont & Latimer		8 July 1889	Main line	Originally Chalfont Road, renamed 1 November 1915. Interchange for National Rail services.	51°40′04″N 000°33′40″W
Chesham		8 July 1889	Chesham	Terminus.	51°42′19″N 000°36′41″W
Amersham		1 September 1892	Amersham	Terminus. Renamed Amersham & Chesham Bois 12 March 1922, Amersham 1937. Interchange for National Rail services.	51°40′27″N 000°36′27″W

=== Former stations ===
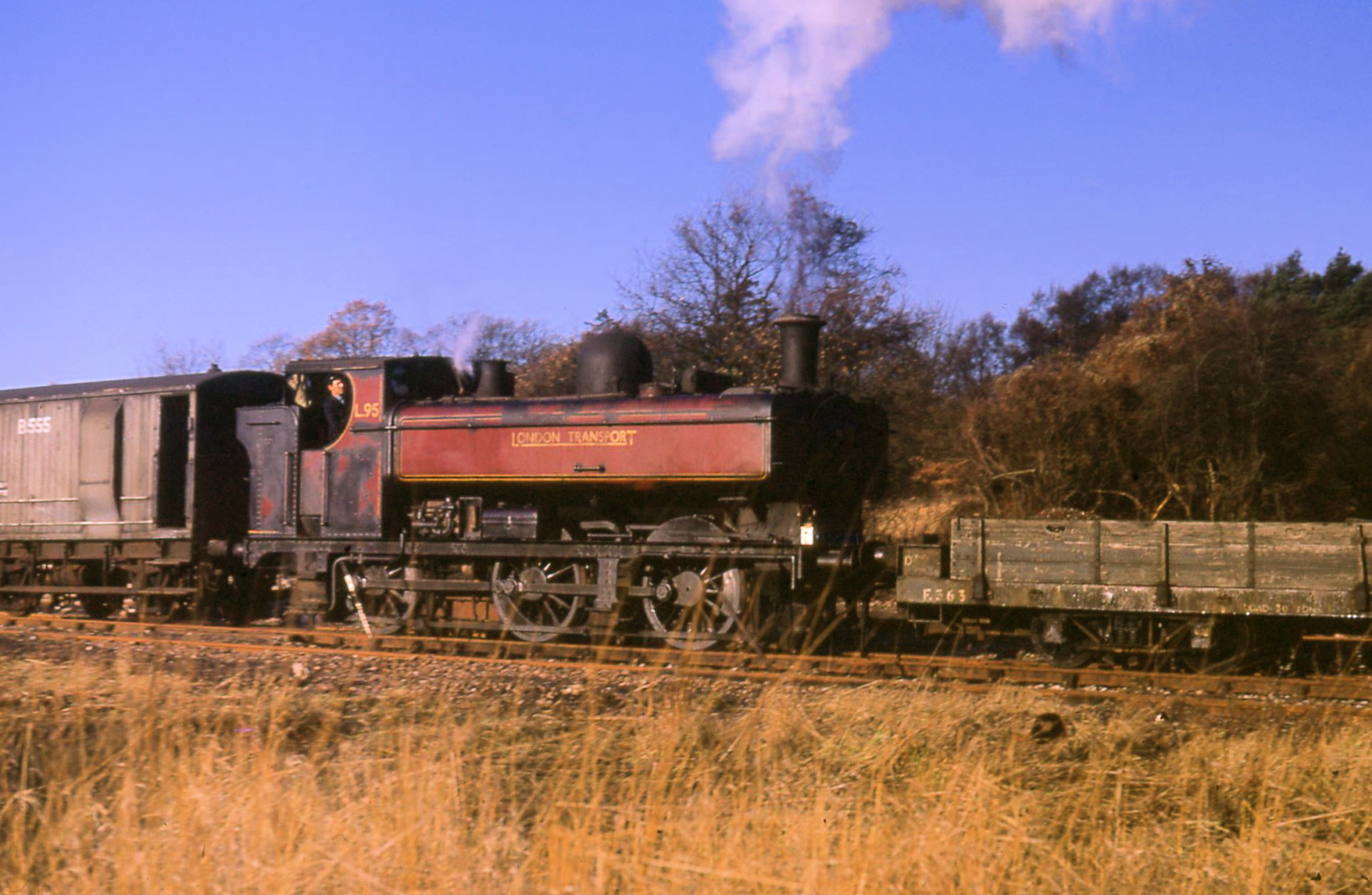
LT loco L92 at Croxley tip in 1969

The Brill Tramway with stations Waddesdon Road, Westcott, Wotton, Church Siding, Wood Siding and Brill closed in 1935. In the following year, the line was cut back to Aylesbury, with Waddesdon station and Granborough Road, Winslow Road stations on the line to Verney Junction closing. Initially Verney Junction and Quainton Road remained open, with main line services provided by the LNER.

In 1939, the Stanmore branch and the stopping service between Finchley Road and Wembley Park were transferred to the Bakerloo line. On the St John's Wood section, Lord's and Marlborough Road stations were replaced by St John's Wood, and Swiss Cottage replaced the Metropolitan line station. The Bakerloo line service to Stanmore was transferred to the Jubilee line when that line opened in 1979.

In 1961, when steam locomotives were replaced and the line was electrified to Amersham, the Underground service to Great Missenden, Wendover, Stoke Mandeville and Aylesbury was withdrawn.

=== Goods-only branches ===
Between Moor Park and Croxley, a short branch ran south-east off the Watford branch, near its junction with the main line, to Croxley Tip, a rubbish dump beside the Grand Union Canal. This site began as a gravel loading point before becoming used by the railway to dump waste such as old ballast and waste from Neasden power station. This route, never used for passenger traffic, continued to be used by London Transport's small fleet of steam engines until 1971, when diesels replaced them. The branch closed some time after this, although a section of the spur line remained visible from a passing train.

A second short branch line, known as the Halton Railway, served RAF Halton near Wendover, across the Wendover Arm of the Grand Union Canal. The line was built during the First World War and closed in 1963. The trackbed is now a footpath.

Although not operated by Metropolitan passenger services, the line from South Harrow to Rayners Lane was built by the Metropolitan railway as the District Railway was in financial difficulties at the time. This included a short branch, part of which is still visible, on a viaduct to a gas works. Other minor freight connections along the line once included connections to the Midland main line at Finchley Road.

A single-track spur from a small yard between Ickenham and Ruislip stations connects to Ruislip Depot of the Central line. This line is used for engineering and empty stock transfers, although occasional plans suggest extending the Central line into Uxbridge by upgrading the connection. It was built in 1973.

== Metropolitan line extension ==
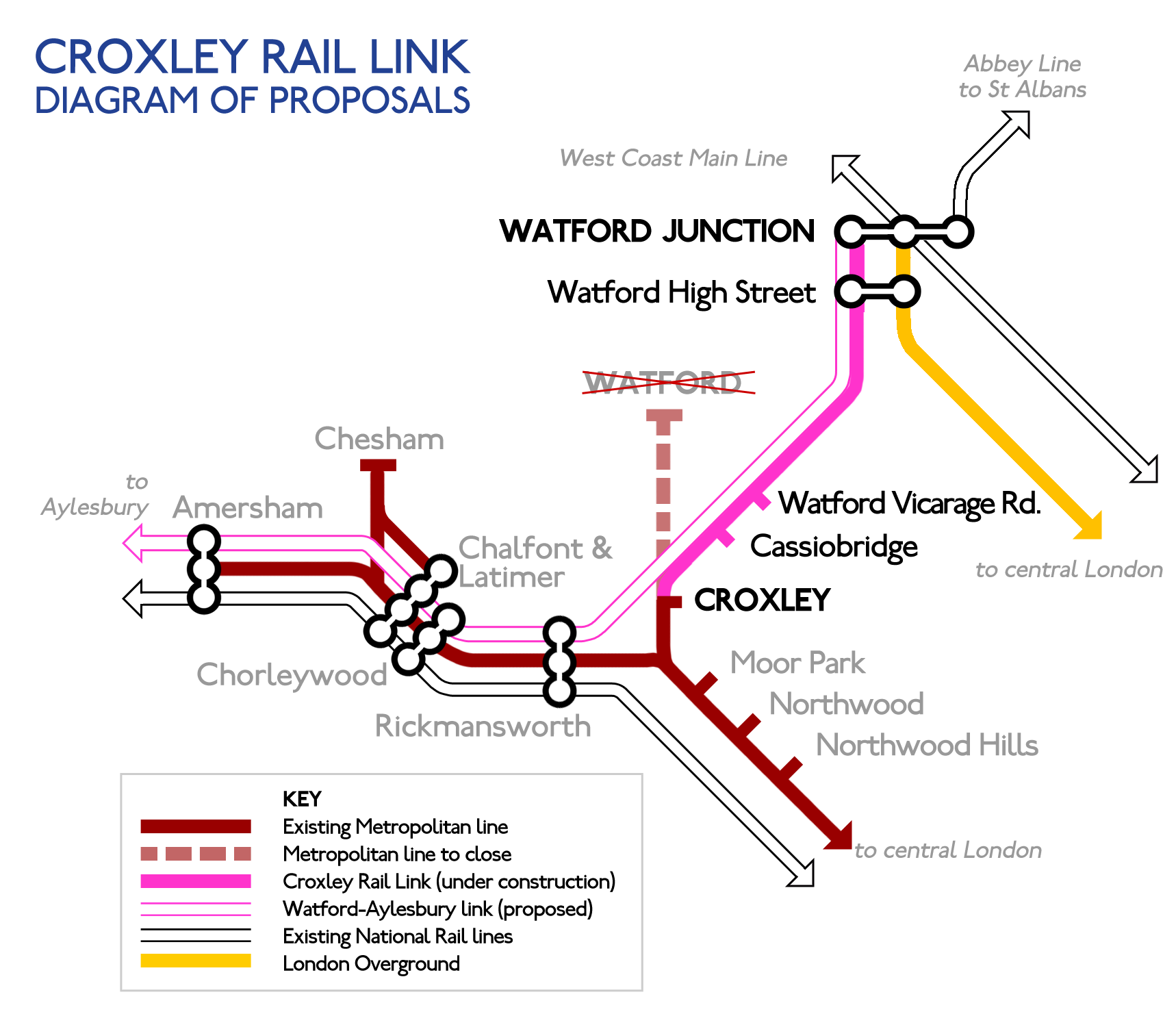
Diagram of the Croxley Rail Link

Also known as the Croxley Rail Link, an extension to the Metropolitan line was to reroute the Watford branch from the current terminus using the disused Croxley Green branch line to Watford Junction. Funding was agreed in December 2011 and the necessary permission was granted by the UK Government in July 2013. Due to a funding shortfall, the project was cancelled in 2016.
