= Ruislip tube station =

London Underground station

Ruislip
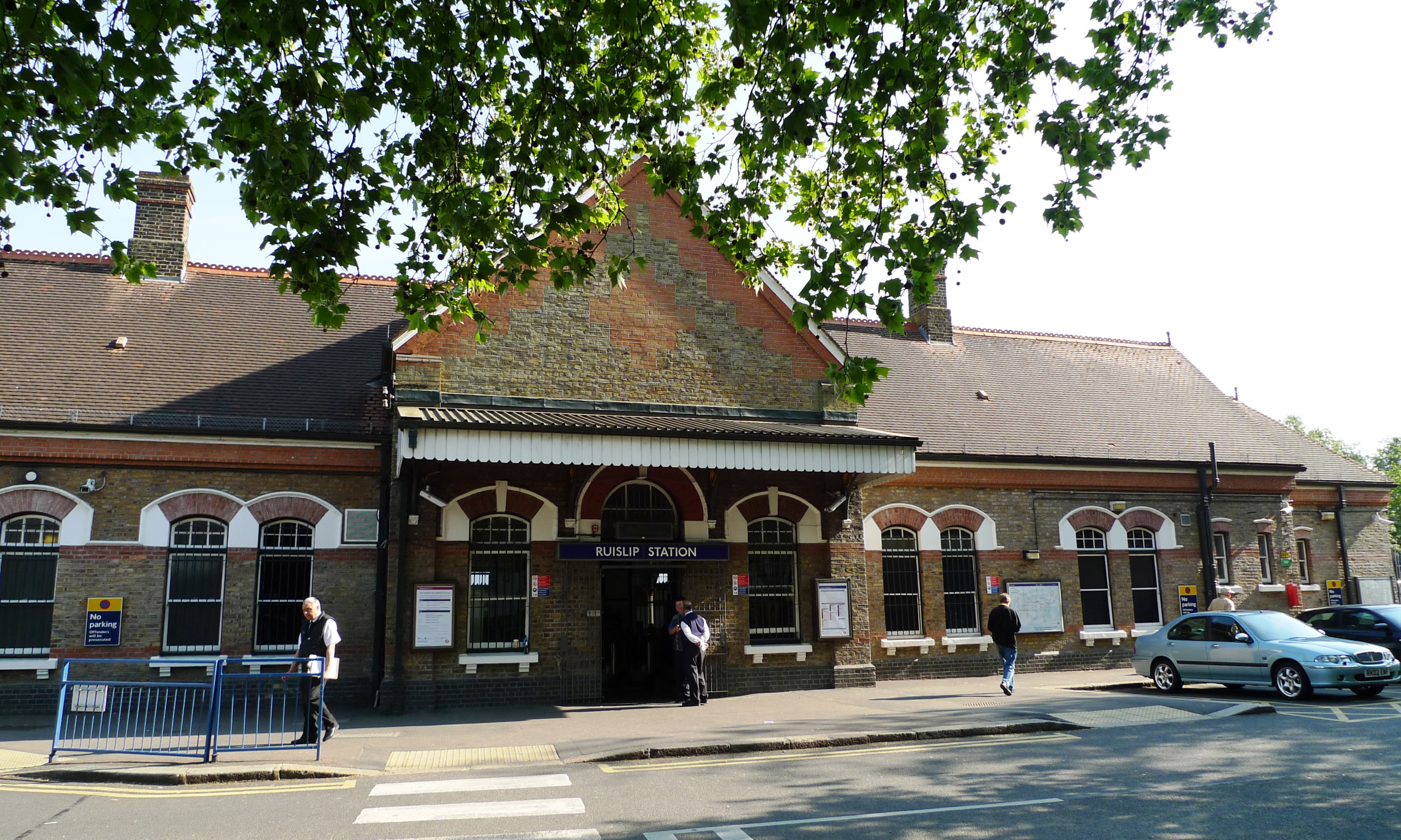
- Station entrance
- Interactive map of Ruislip

General information
- Location: Ruislip
- Local authority: London Borough of Hillingdon
- Managed by: London Underground
- Number of platforms: 2
- Accessible: Yes (Eastbound only)
- Fare zone: 6

London Underground annual entry and exit
- 2020: ▼0.95 million
- 2021: ▼0.82 million
- 2022: ▲1.37 million
- 2023: ▲1.46 million
- 2024: ▲1.49 million

Key dates
- 4 July 1904: Opened (Metropolitan)
- 1 March 1910: Start (District)
- 23 October 1933: End (District)
- 23 October 1933: Start (Piccadilly)
- 10 August 1964: Goods yard closed

Listed status
- Listing grade: II
- Entry number: 1380983
- Added to list: 4 August 2000; 25 years ago

Other information
- External links: TfL station info page
- Coordinates: 51.57139°N 0.42111°W

Ruislip (/ˈraɪslɪp/) is a London Underground station in Ruislip in west London. It is on the Uxbridge branches of both the Metropolitan and Piccadilly lines, between Ickenham and Ruislip Manor stations. The station is located on Station Approach, and is in London fare zone 6. It is the oldest station on the Uxbridge branch of the Metropolitan line and was originally the only intermediate station on the line between Uxbridge and Harrow-on-the-Hill.

== History ==
The first service from Harrow on the Hill to Uxbridge ran on 4 July 1904

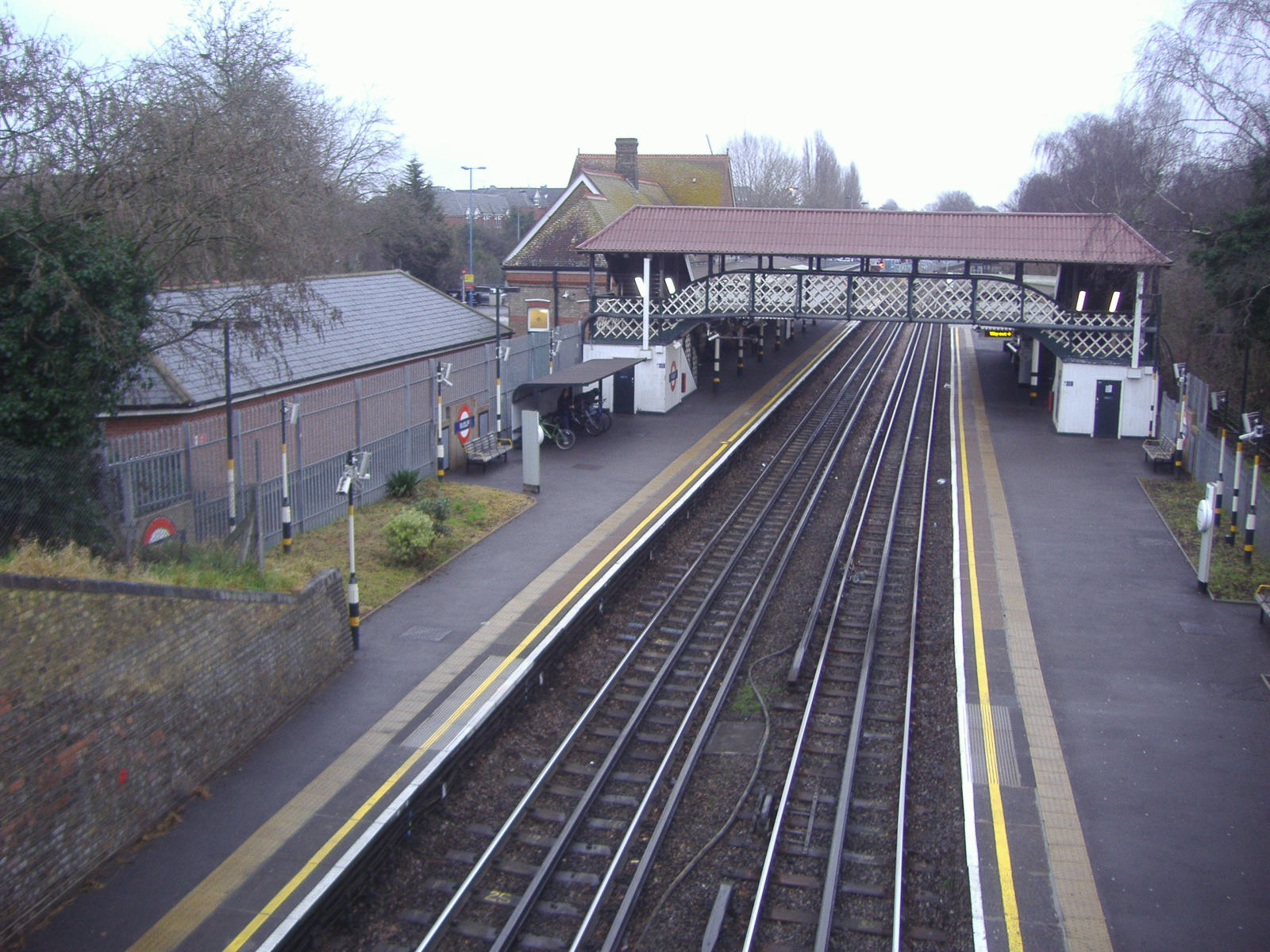
Footbridge linking both platforms

The Metropolitan Railway (Harrow and Uxbridge Railway) constructed the line between Harrow-on-the-Hill and Uxbridge and commenced services on 4 July 1904 with, initially, Ruislip being the only intermediate stop. At first, services were operated by steam trains, but track electrification was completed in the subsequent months and electric trains began operating on 1 January 1905. The formation was made wide enough at Ruislip to enable another pair of tracks to be constructed as passing loops or additional platform roads. Neither has ever occurred.

On 1 March 1910, an extension of the District line from South Harrow to connect with the Metropolitan Railway at Rayners Lane was opened enabling District line trains to serve stations between Rayners Lane and Uxbridge from that date. On 23 October 1933, District line services were replaced by Piccadilly line trains.

Currently, only the station's eastbound (Central London) platform has step-free access. Passengers who wish to travel in the Uxbridge direction and are unable to use the footbridge (which is the only link between the westbound platform and the entrance/exit) must travel to Northwick Park or Sudbury Town and change direction there. In 2018, it was announced that the station will be made fully accessible, as part of a £200m investment to increase the number of accessible stations on the Tube.

It is possible to reverse trains from west to east at Ruislip. Trains must detrain in the westbound platform and then continue for approximately half a mile to a reversing siding leading to Ruislip Depot. After reversing, the train must come back the way it came and enter the eastbound platform by means of a crossover. Unfortunately, while this manoeuvre is carried out, both the westbound and eastbound services are held up. Therefore, this manoeuvre is usually only done by some peak-hour Piccadilly line trains due to the inconvenience it causes. There was formerly a crossover to the east of the station enabling trains to leave the westbound platform in an easterly direction, and a goods yard to the north of the line.

== Services ==
Ruislip station is on the Uxbridge branches of both the Metropolitan and Piccadilly lines in London fare zone 6. It is between Ickenham to the west and Ruislip Manor to the east.

=== Metropolitan line ===
The Metropolitan Line is the only line to operate an express service, though currently for Metropolitan Line trains on the Uxbridge branch this is eastbound only in the morning peaks (06:30 to 09:30) Monday to Friday.

The off-peak service in trains per hour (tph) is:

- 8 tph Eastbound to Aldgate via Baker Street (all stations)
- 8 tph Westbound to Uxbridge

The morning peak service in trains per hour (tph) is:

- 2 tph Eastbound to Aldgate via Baker Street (semi-fast)
- 4 tph Eastbound to Aldgate via Baker Street (all stations)
- 4 tph Eastbound to Baker Street (all stations)
- 10 tph Westbound to Uxbridge

The evening peak service in trains per hour (tph) is:

- 7 tph Eastbound to Aldgate via Baker Street (all stations)
- 3 tph Eastbound to Baker Street (all stations)
- 10 tph Westbound to Uxbridge

=== Piccadilly line ===
Between Rayners Lane and Uxbridge there is no Piccadilly Line service before approximately 06:30 (Monday - Friday) and 08:45 (Saturday - Sunday), except for one early morning departure from Uxbridge at 05:18 (Monday - Saturday) and 06:46 (Sunday).

The off-peak service in trains per hour (tph) is:

- 3 tph Eastbound to Cockfosters
- 3 tph Westbound to Uxbridge

The peak time service in trains per hour (tph) is:

- 6 tph Eastbound to Cockfosters
- 6 tph Westbound to Uxbridge

Preceding station	London Underground	Following station
Ickenham towards Uxbridge	Metropolitan line Uxbridge branch	Ruislip Manor towards Baker Street or Aldgate
Ickenham towards Uxbridge	Piccadilly line Uxbridge branch	Ruislip Manor towards Cockfosters or Arnos Grove
Former services
Preceding station	London Underground	Following station
Ickenham towards Uxbridge	District line (1910–1933)	Ruislip Manor towards Upminster

== Connections ==
London Buses routes serve the station day and night.

== See also ==
Other London Underground stations in Ruislip:

- Ruislip Gardens
- Ruislip Manor
- South Ruislip
- West Ruislip
