= Rayners Lane tube station =

London Underground station

Rayners Lane
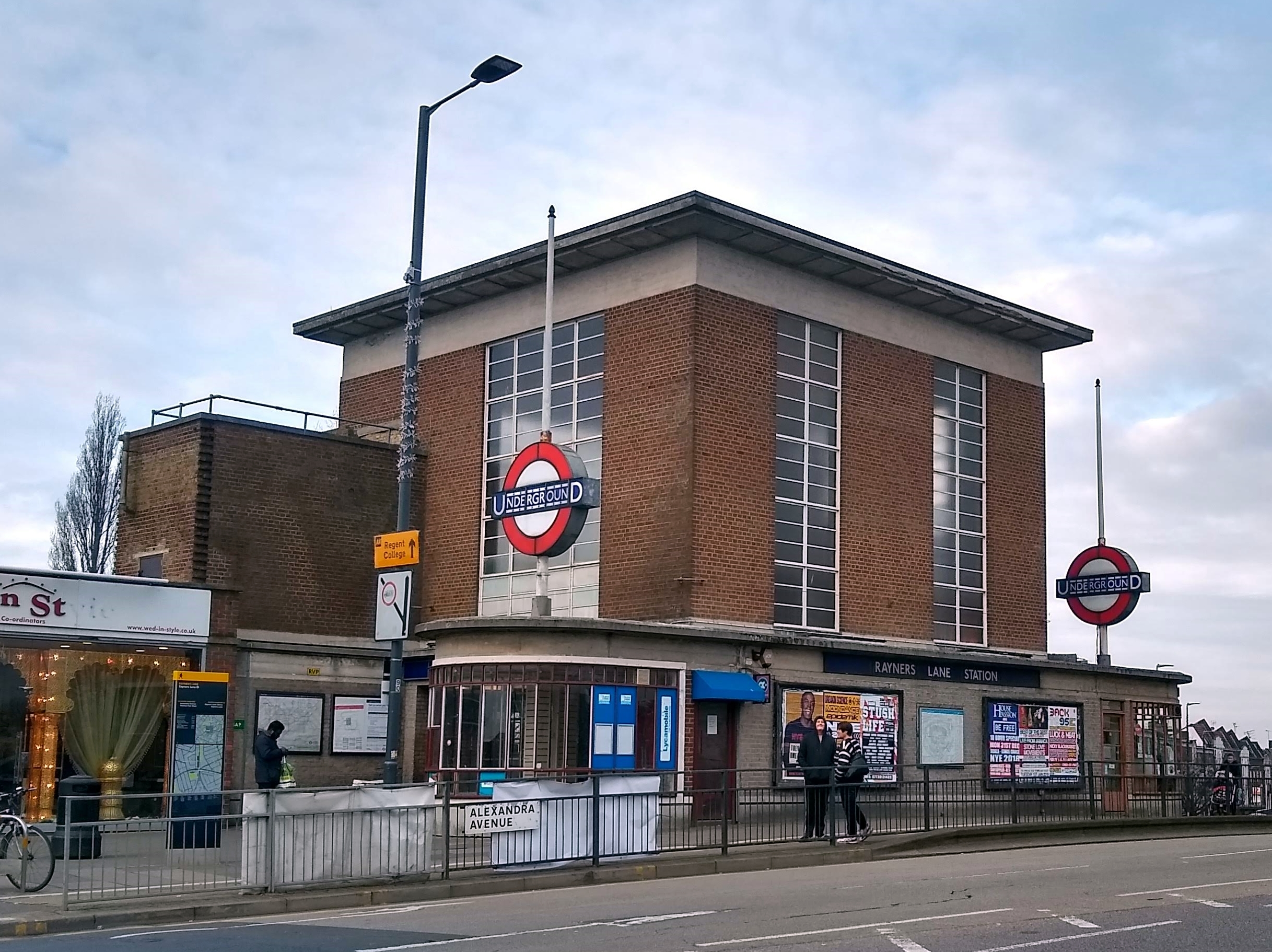
- Rayners Lane station
- Interactive map of Rayners Lane

General information
- Location: Rayners Lane
- Local authority: London Borough of Harrow
- Managed by: London Underground
- Number of platforms: 2
- Fare zone: 5

London Underground annual entry and exit
- 2020: ▼2.34 million
- 2021: ▼1.78 million
- 2022: ▲3.04 million
- 2023: ▲3.34 million
- 2024: ▲3.39 million

Key dates
- 4 July 1904: Tracks laid (Metropolitan)
- 26 May 1906: Opened (Metropolitan)
- 1 March 1910: Start (District)
- 23 October 1933: End (District)
- 23 October 1933: Start (Piccadilly)
- 10 August 1964: Goods yard closed

Listed status
- Listing grade: II
- Entry number: 1261430
- Added to list: 17 May 1994; 32 years ago

Other information
- External links: TfL station info page
- Coordinates: 51.57528°N 0.37139°W

Rayners Lane is a London Underground station, located in the district of Rayners Lane, in north-west London, England. It lies amid a 1930s development, originally named Harrow Garden Village. The station is on the Uxbridge branches of both the Metropolitan and Piccadilly lines. It is located to the west of the junction of Rayners Lane, Alexandra Avenue and Imperial Drive (A4090). It is in London fare zone 5.

Just east of the station, the Metropolitan and Piccadilly lines' tracks join for westbound services to Uxbridge and separate for eastbound services towards Central London.

== History ==
The Metropolitan Railway (Harrow and Uxbridge Railway) constructed the line between Harrow on the Hill and Uxbridge and commenced services on 4 July 1904 with, initially, Ruislip being the only intermediate stop. At first, services were operated by steam trains, but track electrification was completed in the subsequent months and electric trains began operating on 1 January 1905.

Progressive development in the north Middlesex area over the next two decades led to the gradual opening of additional stations along the Uxbridge branch to encourage the growth of new residential areas. Rayners Lane opened as Rayners Lane Halt on 26 May 1906, and was named after a local farmer called Daniel Rayner. It was nicknamed Pneumonia Junction because of its exposed location.

On 1 March 1910, an extension of the District line was opened from South Harrow to connect with the Metropolitan Railway at Rayners Lane junction east of the station enabling District line trains to serve stations between Rayners Lane and Uxbridge from that date. On 23 October 1933, District line services were replaced by Piccadilly line trains.

== Design ==
The station, more a halt, was rebuilt, following the start of house building in the locality in the 1930s that saw passenger figures rise from 22,000 per annum in 1930 to 4 million in 1937 by a new station to a design by Charles Holden and Reginald Uren that opened on 8 August 1938. Work had started in earnest with the opening of a temporary timber booking hall and shops on 14 March 1935 allowing work on the new station to proceed.

The station, now Grade II Listed by Historic England, features the large cube-shaped brick and glass ticket hall capped with a flat reinforced concrete roof and geometrical forms typical of the new stations built in this period. To the west of the station, there is a reversing siding between the running tracks and, during the day, half of the Piccadilly line service reverses here. Two sidings were located south of the station but these were no longer used, with no connection with the running lines. In late 2017, these sidings were lifted.

== Services ==
Rayners Lane station is on the Uxbridge branches of both the Metropolitan and Piccadilly lines in London fare zone 5.

=== Metropolitan line ===
On the Metropolitan line, Rayners Lane station is between Eastcote to the west and West Harrow to the east.

The off-peak service in trains per hour (tph) is:

- 8 tph eastbound to Aldgate (all stations)
- 8 tph westbound to Uxbridge

The morning peak service in trains per hour (tph) is:

- 2 tph eastbound to Aldgate (semi-fast, running non-stop between Harrow-on-the-Hill and Wembley Park)
- 4 tph eastbound to Aldgate (all stations)
- 4 tph eastbound to Baker Street (all stations)
- 10 tph westbound to Uxbridge

The evening peak service in trains per hour (tph) is:

- 7 tph eastbound to Aldgate (all stations)
- 3 tph eastbound to Baker Street (all stations)
- 10 tph westbound to Uxbridge

This is the only line in the network to operate an express service, though currently for Metropolitan Line trains on the Uxbridge branch this is eastbound only in the morning peaks (06:30 to 09:30) Monday to Friday.

Metropolitan Line trains are able to terminate at Rayners Lane from the westbound platform either by a crossover to the east of the station or via a centre reversing siding to the west, under normal circumstances all westbound Metropolitan Line trains continue to the terminus of the branch at Uxbridge.

=== Piccadilly line ===
On the Piccadilly line, Rayners Lane station is between Eastcote to the west and South Harrow to the east.

The off-peak service in trains per hour (tph) is:

- 6 tph eastbound to Cockfosters
- 3 tph westbound to Uxbridge

The peak time service in trains per hour (tph) is:

- 12 tph eastbound to Cockfosters
- 8 tph westbound to Uxbridge.

Between Rayners Lane and Uxbridge, there is no Piccadilly Line service before approximately 06:30 (Monday - Friday) and 08:45 (Saturday - Sunday), except for one early morning departure from Uxbridge at 05:18 (Monday - Saturday) and 06:46 (Sunday).

Trains are able to terminate here by means of a crossover to the east of the station (separate from the Metropolitan Line crossover) and via the centre reversing siding, although only the latter is used in normal service.

Preceding station	London Underground	Following station
Eastcote towards Uxbridge	Metropolitan line Uxbridge branch	West Harrow towards Baker Street or Aldgate
Eastcote towards Uxbridge	Piccadilly line Through services	South Harrow towards Cockfosters or Arnos Grove
Terminus	Piccadilly line Terminating services	South Harrow towards Cockfosters or Arnos Grove
Former services
Preceding station	London Underground	Following station
Eastcote towards Uxbridge	District line (1910–1933)	South Harrow towards Upminster

== Connections ==
London Buses routes 398, H9, H10 and H12 serve the station.
