= Cockfosters Depot =

Facility for London Underground trains

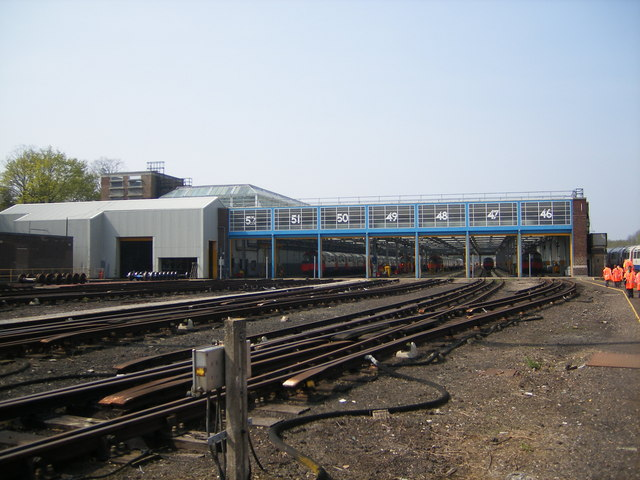
- The depot seen in 2007
- Interactive map of Cockfosters Depot

Location
- Location: Cockfosters, London, England
- Coordinates: 51.6489°N 0.1400°W

Characteristics
- Owner: London Underground
- Rolling stock: 1973 Stock

History
- Opened: 1932

Cockfosters Depot is a London Underground depot in Cockfosters in the London Borough of Enfield, located between Oakwood and Cockfosters stations on the Piccadilly line.

== History ==
The depot opened in 1932 as part of the extension of the Piccadilly line to Cockfosters. Along with Northfields Depot, which opened in the same year, it replaced the original Piccadilly line depot at Lillie Bridge.

In preparation for an upgrade of the Piccadilly line and the arrival of the London Underground 2024 Stock, a substantial upgrade of the depot is underway, involving the demolition of much of the existing depot including the maintenance and cleaning shed and train wash.
