= London Underground 1938 Stock =

London Underground tube stock design

1938 Stock
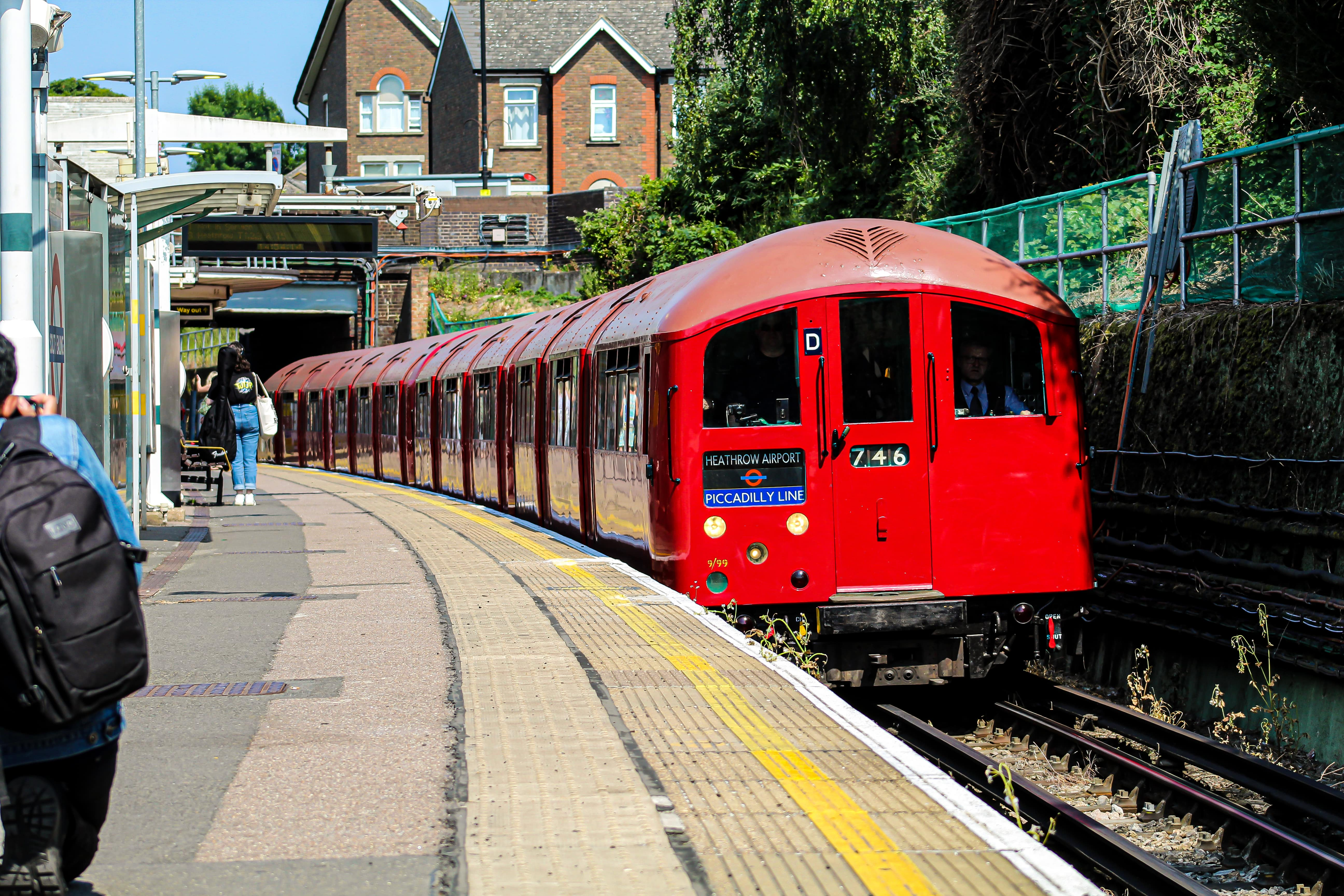
- A preserved train of 1938 Stock at South Ealing station

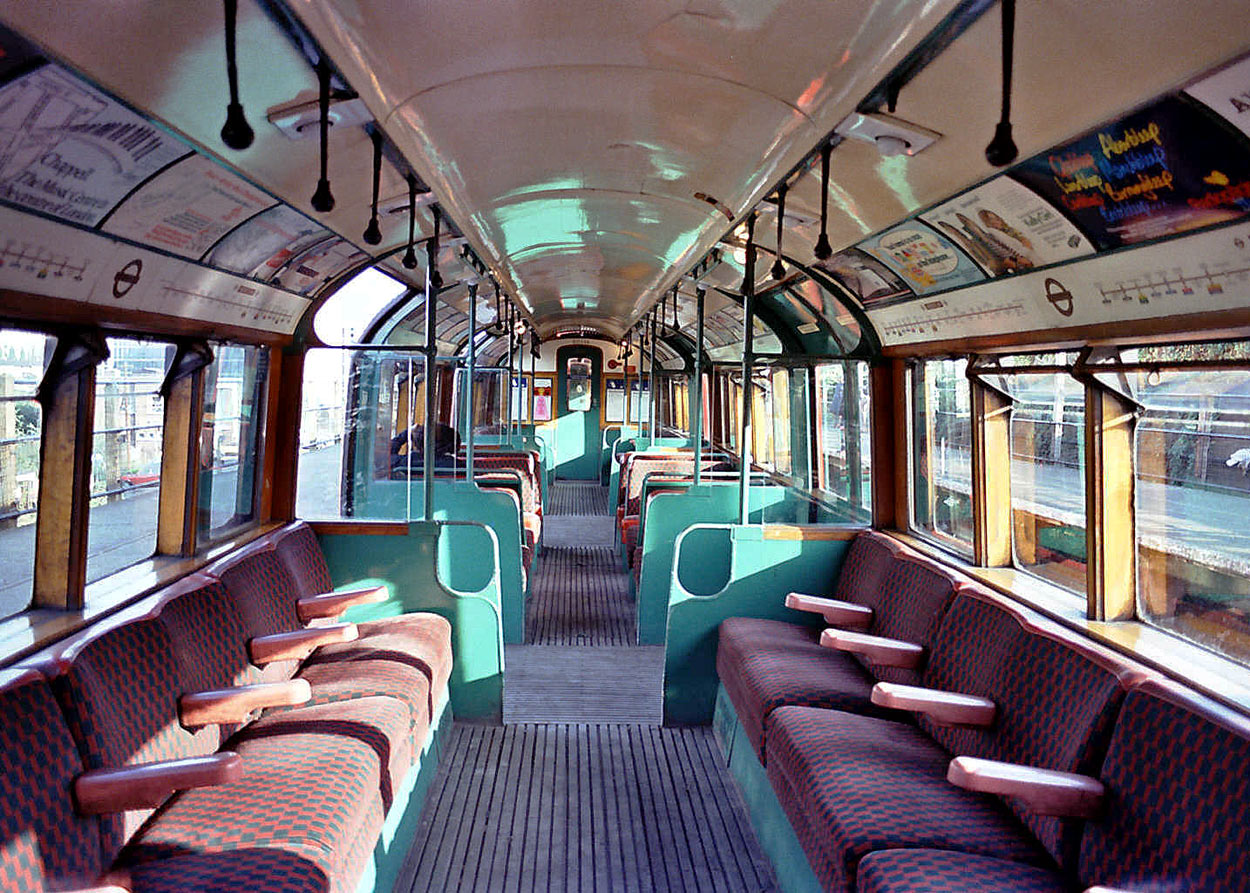
- The interior of a 1938 Stock train on the Bakerloo line
- Stock type: Deep-level tube
- In service: 1938–1988 on London Underground; 1989–2021 on Island Line (as Class 483)
- Manufacturers: BRC&W; Metro-Cammell
- Constructed: 1937–1940
- Operator: London Underground

Specifications
- Car length: DM 52 ft 3 3/4 in (15.94 m); NDM/UNDM/T 51 ft 2 3/4 in (15.61 m)
- Width: 8 ft 6 1/4 in (2.597 m)
- Height: 9 ft 5 1/2 in (2.883 m)
- Weight: DM 27.4 long tons (27.8 t; 30.7 short tons); NDM 25.9 long tons (26.3 t; 29.0 short tons); T 20.65 long tons (20.98 t; 23.13 short tons)
- Seating: DM 42; NDM/UNDM/T 40

The London Underground 1938 Stock is a London Underground tube stock design. A total of 1,121 cars were built by Metro-Cammell and Birmingham RC&W. An additional 173 cars were added to the fleet by the end of 1953, comprising 91 new builds (the 1949 Tube Stock), 76 conversions from Pre-1938 Tube Stock or 1935 Tube Stock, and six unconverted cars of 1935 Tube Stock, and the stock was used on the London Underground until 1988. During their long lives they worked on the Bakerloo, Northern, Piccadilly, East London, Central, and Northern City lines. Ten sets were refurbished and ran on the Isle of Wight as Class 483, making them the oldest passenger rolling stock operating timetabled services on the National Rail network at the time of their withdrawal in January 2021.

The trains represented a major technical advance, as all the electrical equipment was located under the floor for the first time. All previous tube stock had large equipment compartments behind the driving cabs in motor cars, which reduced the space available for passengers by about a third.

== Numbers ==
There were four types of car, one of which was produced in two forms:

- Driving Motor (DM) – 42 seats, plus 2 tip-up
  - 'A' DM – north/west facing; (Note: Not applicable to the Northern Line as trains are turned through 180 degrees each time they traverse the Kennington loop.) solid centre buffer
  - 'D' DM – south/east facing; spring-loaded centre buffer
- Non-Driving Motor (NDM) – 40 seats, no driving or door controls
- Special Non-Driving Motor (SNDM) – door controls only
- Trailer (T) – 40 seats, no motors or controls

As built, the 1938 Stock was numbered as follows:

'A' DM	'D' DM		NDM	SNDM	T
10012 – 10323; 90324 – 90333	11012 – 11323; 91324 – 91333		12000 – 12028; 92029 – 92058; 12059 – 12157 12409 – 12411 12422 – 12446	92447 – 92466	012158 – 012388; 092389 – 092408 012412 – 012421 012467 – 012476
322	322	Total	186	20	271

== Use on different lines ==
The 1938 Stock was built as part of the London Passenger Transport Board's New Works Programme 1935–1940. The trains were primarily intended for use on the Northern and Bakerloo lines, with an additional seven trains also being used on the Piccadilly line.

As part of the New Works Programme, the Northern and Central lines were to be extended over London and North Eastern Railway (LNER) tracks, and because of a joint working agreement between the LPTB and the LNER, it was necessary for a proportion of the Underground fleet to be owned by the LNER. Accordingly, 289 cars of 1938 Stock (DM numbers 10238–323 and 11238–323, NDM numbers 12117–57 and T numbers 012313–88) were designated as LNER owned, and fitted with plates marked "Property of LNER". Although 129 of these were to cover extensions to the Central line, none of them actually worked Central line services: they were mixed with the Northern and Bakerloo line fleets.

Throughout the 1950s and 1960s, the Northern line was worked exclusively by 1938/1949 Stock trains. They were starting to show their age by the late 1960s; the first withdrawals from the Northern line took place in the early 1970s with the introduction of the 1972 Stock trains.

In the mid-1970s, the 1972 Stock (Mark II) cars began to be used on the Bakerloo line in addition to 1938 Stock. The 1972 Stock cars were intended for eventual use on the Jubilee line (which opened in 1979), thereafter the remaining section of the Bakerloo line continued to be served exclusively by 1938 Stock cars until the 1980s. The Bakerloo line trains received an "Extra Heavy Overhaul" (EHO) to keep them in service long after their intended withdrawal date. The Bakerloo line was thus the last line to be operated solely by 1938 Stock trains.

The Piccadilly line's few 1938 Stock trains operated alongside 1959 Stock for much of their lives. They were replaced by London Underground 1973 Stock, with the 1959 Stock being transferred to the Northern line, replacing other 1938 Stock trains.

During the 1970s, the short East London Line was worked by 1938 Stock trains, replacing trains of Q Stock. Single 1938 Stock trailer carriages were also inserted into 1960 Stock trains in the mid-1980s; these were used on the Woodford–Hainault and Epping–Ongar sections of the Central line. In addition, unit 10177 (latterly shipped to Alderney) worked the Epping–Ongar shuttle between November 1957 and June 1960.

With the 1959 Stock approaching life-expiry, five ex-Bakerloo line trains of 1938 Stock were given a further overhaul in the mid-1980s. These were then used on the Northern line for a further two years; the last day of passenger service was on 19 May 1988. They were then sold for further use on the Isle of Wight (see below).

== Nine-car trains ==
As part of the New Works Programme of 1935–1940, there were plans to operate nine-car trains of 1938 stock on the Northern line. These cars were originally numbered differently from the other cars, the first digit '1' being replaced by a '9'.

The formation for a nine-car train would have been DM + NDM + SNDM + T + NDM + T + SNDM + NDM + DM.

With the scaling back of the planned extensions for the Northern and Bakerloo lines, and the need to order further stock to balance the fleet (the 1949 stock), cars were renumbered in the early 1950s. The DMs, trailers, as well as twenty-eight of the thirty NDMs had the '9' replaced by a '1', the DMs becoming 10324-10333 and 11324-11333, the trailers 012389-012408, and the NDMs 12029-12054 and 12056-12057. NDMs 92055 and 92058 were rebuilt into Uncoupling Non-Driving Motors (UNDMs) along with all twenty SNDMs. The twenty two cars rebuilt into UNDMs were renumbered 30000-30021.

== 1935/1949 Stock ==
So successful was the 1938 Stock that, when, in 1948, additional cars were needed, 91 almost identical cars were built, 70 non-driving-motor (NDM) cars and 21 trailer cars. These were known as 1949 stock and operated with the 1938 stock. They were numbered in the same scheme; the UNDMs were numbered 30022-30045, 31000-31045 and the trailers 012495-012515.

After World War II, the former 1935 stock streamlined DMs were rebuilt into trailers, and included with the 1938 stock, being renumbered 012477-012494. Before the war, three trailers were built for use with the streamlined DMs. These three cars differed from the 1938 trailers in that they were not equipped with compressors. However, the cars were not delivered until after the war and with the DMs rebuilt the three cars became part of the 1938 stock fleet, being numbered 012412-012414, and fitted with compressors.

== Technical ==
=== Electrical system ===
Each motor car is fitted with two series DC motors, one on each of the two bogies and are designed to operate from the 630 volt traction supply. Each motor has an output of approximately 250 horsepower. The controllers and switchgear are operated from a 50 volt auxiliary supply provided by a motor-generator set. This system allows the master controller at one end of the train to simultaneously operate the switchgear on all the motor cars in a similar manner to the system developed by Sprague for the Elevated railway in Chicago, Illinois some 46 years earlier. This same supply is also used to power the train lighting as well as some other auxiliary circuits.

=== 'A' and 'D' motor cars ===
The motor cars are divided into two distinct types, the 'A' end car and the 'D' end car. Each of the bogies fitted to the two cars is identical. This means that if the two motor cars at the two ends of a train were identical, they would attempt to pull the train in opposite directions. Consequently, the bogies on the 'D' end motor car are installed the other way around from those on the 'A' end causing the two motor cars to move the train in the same direction.

The 'A' and 'D' designation is from the designation of the axles on the two bogies. The 'A' end car has the 'A' axle at the driving cab end of the car with the 'B' axle on the opposite end of the same bogie. The 'C' axle on the second bogie is nearest the driving cab with the 'D' axle closest to the coupled trailer car. The sequence is reversed on the 'D' end motor car. This is also why the alternate car is not designated the logically more obvious 'B' end. (Note: The two ends of most older style trams were identified as 'A' and 'B' (marked on the inside of the driving position). This was a reminder to the electrical maintenance staff to reverse the field connections at the 'B' end relative to those at the 'A' end.)

Another mechanical difference between the two types of car is that the 'D' end car has a spring-loaded buffer at the driving cab end whereas the 'A' end car has a solid buffer.

These differences mean that when coupling two train sets together, the 'A' end of one set must be coupled to the 'D' end of the other. Although train sets are not normally split in day-to-day usage, they do have to be split when undergoing major maintenance tasks, such as when the bodies are lifted off of the bogies. This is not a problem on most lines, where all the train sets start and remain the same way around. However, on the Northern line the existence of the Kennington loop, just south of Kennington station, which allows Charing Cross branch trains to depart from its southbound platform and arrive at its northbound platform reverses the complete train once every journey. This means that, on this line, on average, half the trains will be facing in the opposite direction to the remainder. Only sets facing the same way can be coupled together.

=== Traction control ===
The 1938 design stock features the (by this time) standard series/parallel traction control using bridge transition. The control system has an unusual feature. Ordinarily, the driver moves the master controller from 'off' up to 'full series' and then further to the 'full parallel' position when the train will be under full power.

The unusual feature is that once the driver has moved the controller to 'full parallel' and the train has accelerated to the point where the switchgear is actually in full parallel, (Note: Although the driver can select 'full parallel' the switchgear itself only allows the mechanism to select the next step in the accelerating sequence once the train is moving fast enough.) the driver can then move the master controller back to 'full series'. The traction switchgear will remain in 'full parallel' unless the driver moves the master controller from 'full series' to any position towards 'off'. Many drivers took advantage of this feature because it was more comfortable maintaining the downward pressure on the deadman's handle with the handle at the 6 o'clock position (the 'full series' position) rather than the 9 o'clock position (the 'full parallel' position).

== 58 trailers ==
Some of the 1938 Stock trains were to provide the additional trains needed for line extensions, primarily on the Northern and Central lines; some were to replace older trains that were life-expired. It was desirable to concentrate the bulk of the 1938 Stock on two lines, the Bakerloo and Northern, and so a redistribution of the 'Standard Stock' occurred, most of it moving to the Central and Piccadilly lines. This redistribution involved reforming some 'Standard Stock' trains to have a different number of cars, as a result of which fifty-eight 'Standard Stock' trailers, originally built in 1927, became surplus to that fleet. In 1938, these were converted to operate with the 1938 Stock, allowing the number of new cars to be correspondingly reduced. Since they differed significantly from the 1938 Stock and also from the rest of the 'Standard Stock', it was necessary to give them a different designation – and so they became known as the '58' trailers, 58 simply being the number of converted cars. These cars were renumbered 70513–70570. The first car withdrawn was 70550, as a result of damage sustained in an accident at Watford Junction in 1962, and the last car, 70534, was withdrawn in 1973.

== Isle of Wight ==
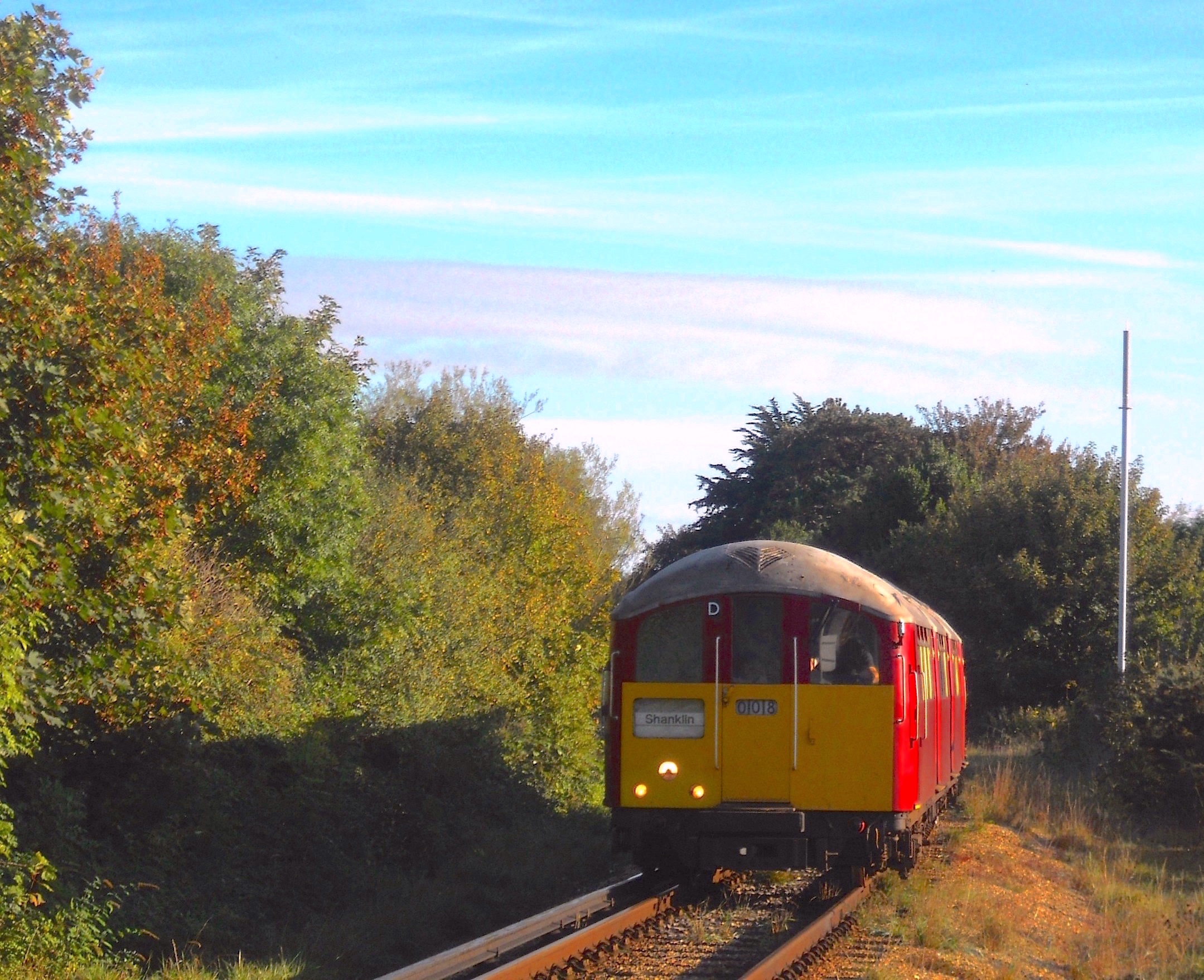
Island Line Class 483 No. 008 arrives at Shanklin

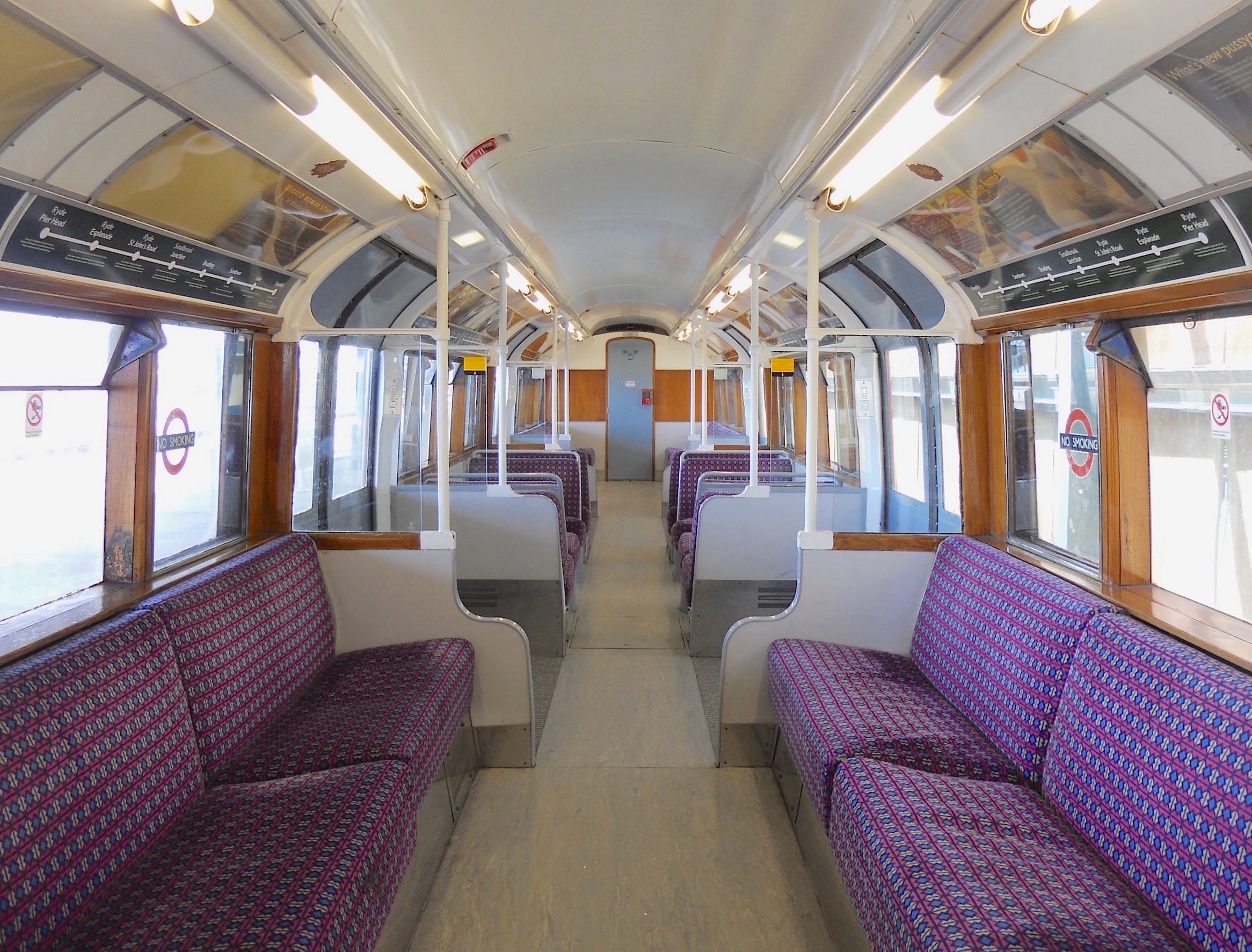
The interior of a Class 483

In 1988, ten sets of 1938 stock were bought by Network SouthEast for use on the Island Line service on the Isle of Wight, and were allocated two-car TOPS Class 483. These units were heavily rebuilt and introduced between 1989 and 1992 to replace the even older Class 485 and 486 trains that had been running on the line since 1967, also constructed from ex-Tube stock. Four sets have been scrapped and the other six have been withdrawn, with the final service running on the 3 January 2021. At the time of withdrawal, January 2021, on the Class 483s were the oldest stock in mainline usage in the United Kingdom, aged 82 years.

The units were leased from HSBC Rail until South West Trains bought them outright in May 2007.

After running many years in Network SouthEast (NSE) colours, the trains were repainted into a Dinosaur themed livery to celebrate the Isle of Wight's rich palaeontological history. However, due to customer dissatisfaction, all trains returned to an approximation of their original LT train red livery; albeit with yellow fronts, as per mainline regulations in 2008. By early-2018, the units had Island Line branding and the South Western Railway logo.

In 2019, South Western Railway announced that as part of a £26m programme of improvements to the Island Line, the Class 483s were finally due to be replaced, following a spate of severe service interruptions from technical faults arising in the 81-year-old stock. The Vivarail D-Train, converted from London Underground D78 Stock, was selected as the successor to the Class 483s; five two-car EMU units are to be used on the network and classified as Class 484. The last converted 1938 stock ran in early 2021. Of the six units extant on the Isle of Wight at the time of retirement, four have been secured for preservation. 483006 and 483008 were obtained by the London Transport Traction Group for preservation and are currently at the Llanelli and Mynydd Mawr Railway in Carmarthenshire. South Wales two of the four preserved units are remaining on the Isle of Wight; 483007 was transferred to the adjacent Isle of Wight Steam Railway, initially as a static exhibit but with a medium-term goal of running the train, either via propulsion from one of the railway's diesel shunters or through the installation of a battery power supply system, while 483004, which had previously been used as a source of spare parts after withdrawal, was purchased by and delivered to Holliers Farm in Hale Common, near the village of Arreton.

'A' DM		'D' DM	
LU	BR	LU	BR
10116	123	11116	223
10139	spare	11142	225
10142	125	11172	spare
10184	121	11184	221
10205	124	11205	224
10221	122	11221	222
10255	128	11255	228
10229	129	11229	229
10291	127	11291	227
10297	126	11297	226

== Accidents ==
A crash involving a 1938 stock train occurred at Moorgate on 28 February 1975. A train hit the dead-end wall in a tunnel at the terminus station, killing 43 people – including the driver – in circumstances that remain unclear to this day. Following the accident, a safety system named after the crash (Moorgate control) was introduced in 1978.

== Preservation ==
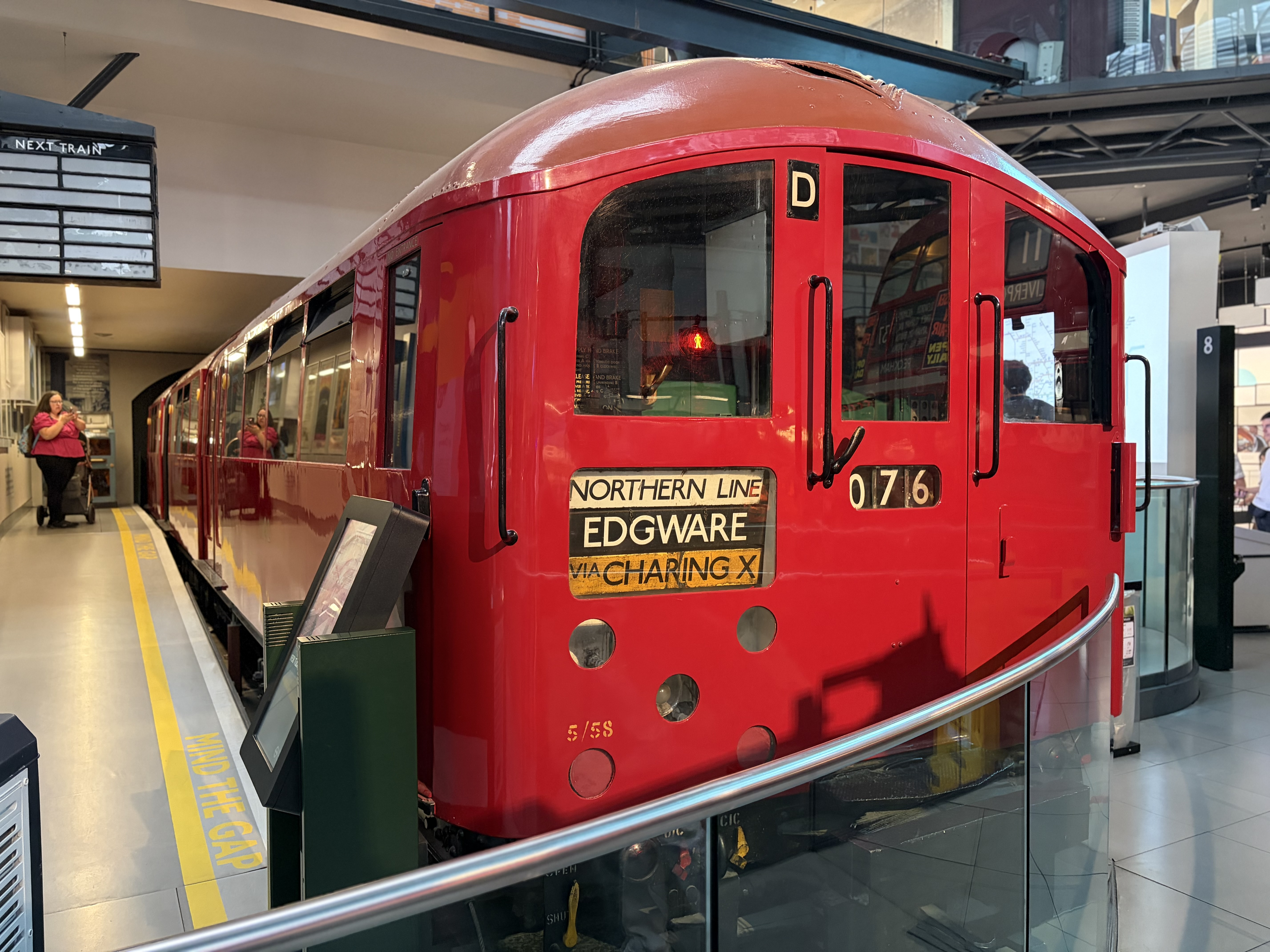
A 1938 tube stock car preserved at the London Transport Museum

In addition, some other units survive in preservation, including cars from the first-built unit, which are preserved at the London Transport Museum Depot in Acton. The preserved sets have been restored into their original red liveries, one with an orange roof (Bakerloo line) and one with a grey roof (other lines). The London Transport Museum operates trips of its preserved four-car set for railtours around the London Underground network. The 1938 stock is also used for occasional filming work. A cab has been preserved at London Transport Museum in Covent Garden.

All six Class 483 units on the Isle of Wight at the time of the type's retirement have been set aside for preservation. A complete Class 483, 483006, was purchased by the Epping Ongar Railway from the Island Line, Isle of Wight in 2020, for restoration and eventual conversion to battery power; it has since been moved to the Llanelli and Mynydd Mawr Railway in Wales, being joined by 483008. Another unit, 483007, named "Jess Harper," was acquired by the Isle of Wight Steam Railway for static display.

The Alderney Railway rostered some 1938 stock cars, formerly used on the Bakerloo and Northern lines, until they were withdrawn in 2000 due to severe rust issues.

'A' DM	T	NDM	'D' DM	Location
10012	012256	12048	11012 (Originally 11178)	London Transport Museum Depot, Acton
—	—	—	11182	London Transport Museum, Covent Garden
11149	—	—	—	London Transport Museum, Covent Garden (Cab Only)
11242	—	—	—	Buckinghamshire Railway Centre, (Cab Only)

Key
DM	Driving motor
T	Trailer
NDM	Non-driving motor

== Commemoration ==
On 9 January 2013, 1938 tube stock appeared on a £1.28 British postage stamp as part of a set commemorating the 150th anniversary of the first London underground train journey. The stamp's captions read "Classic rolling stock" and "1938", with the caption's background in Bakerloo line colour.
