= London Underground 1949 Stock =

Class of train rolling stock

1949 Stock
- Stock type: Deep-level tube
- In service: 1949-1978
- Manufacturer: BRC&W

The 1949 Tube Stock was composed of ninety-one cars built by the Birmingham Railway Carriage and Wagon Company in Smethwick, England. These cars were identical to the earlier 1938 stock with which they were used.

Seventy cars were built as UNDMs (Uncoupling Non-Driving-Motors) numbered 30022 - 30045 and 31000 - 31045, while the remaining twenty-one were trailer cars, numbered 012495 - 012515. The UNDMs were delivered between 16 November 1951 and 20 December 1952, entering service between 10 March 1952 and 21 January 1953; whereas the trailers were delivered between 16 February 1952 and 15 November 1952, with entry to service between 10 October 1952 and 21 July 1953.

They were built for use on a planned extension of the Bakerloo line to Camberwell, but, after the extension was cancelled, they were also used on the Piccadilly, and Northern lines.

The first cars were taken out of service in 1972. The last UNDM, 31030, was withdrawn in 1973, while the last trailer, 012498, was withdrawn in 1978.

33 of the 1949TS UNDM shunting control cabinets were reclaimed and fitted into the original batch of 1972 Mk2 tube stock UNDMs. The 1949 shunting control cabinets were replaced by modern equipment as part of the 1972 Mk2 refurbishment programme in 1991–95.
