= London Underground cooling =

Temperature control on the London Underground

In summer, temperatures on parts of the London Underground can become very uncomfortable due to its deep and poorly ventilated tube tunnels: temperatures as high as 47 °C (117 °F) were reported in the 2006 European heatwave. Posters may be observed on the Underground network advising that passengers carry a bottle of water to help keep cool.

== Source of the heat ==
Heat source	%
Braking losses	38%
Mechanical losses	22%
Drive losses	16%
Train auxiliaries	13%
Tunnel systems	4%
Station systems and passengers	4%
Train passengers	3%
Source: Rail Engineering

The heat in the tunnels is largely generated by the trains, with a small amount coming from station equipment and passengers. Around 79% is absorbed by the tunnels' walls, 10% is removed by ventilation, and the other 11% remains in the tunnels.

Temperatures on the Underground have slowly increased as the clay around the tunnels has warmed up; in the early days of the Underground it was advertised as a place to keep cool on hot days. However, over time the temperature has slowly risen as the heat sink formed by the clay has reached its thermal capacity. When the tunnels were built the clay temperature was around 14 °C (57 °F); this has now risen to 19–26 °C (66–79 °F) and air temperatures in the tunnels now reach as high as 30 °C (86 °F).

== Cooling methods ==
=== Tunnels ===
Heat is extracted from the tunnels using ventilation shafts, with air forced out of the vents by the piston effect (trains pushing air forwards as they pass through the tunnels) or fans.

=== Stations ===
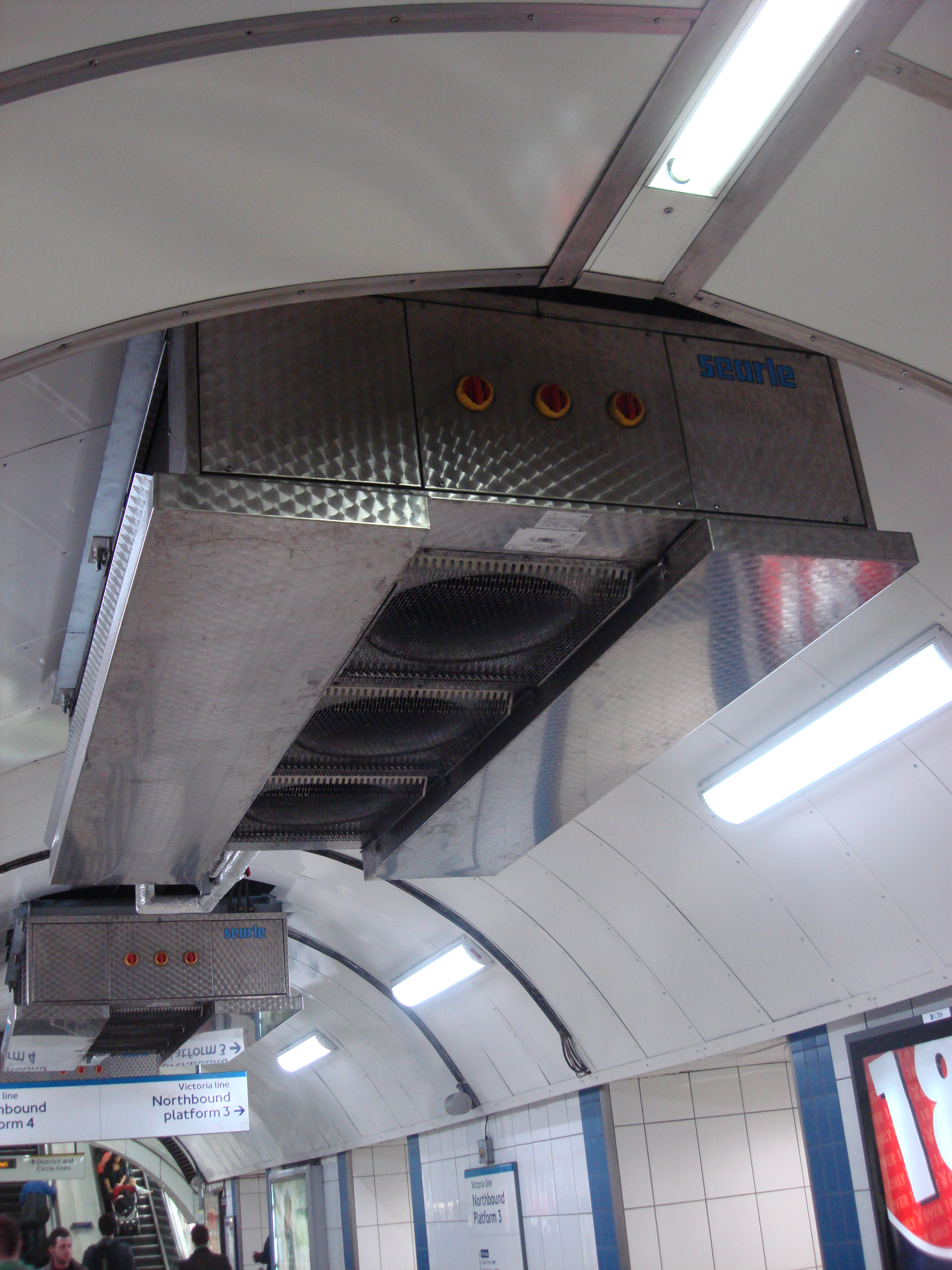
Air cooling on trial at Victoria station (Alternative picture)

Heat pumps were trialled in 1938 and have been proposed again recently to overcome this problem. Following a successful demonstration in 2001 funds were given to the School of Engineering at the London South Bank University to develop a prototype; work began in April 2002. A prize of £100,000 was offered by the Mayor of London during the hot summer of 2003 for a solution to the problem, but the competition ended in 2005 without a winner.

A year-long trial of a groundwater cooling system began in June 2006 at London Victoria station. If successful, the trial will be extended to 30 other deep-level stations. For this trial Metronet installed London South Bank University's system comprising three fan coil units which use water that has seeped into the tunnels and is pumped from the tunnels to absorb the heat, after which it is discharged in the sewer system. The scheme was one of the winners in the Carbon Trust's 2007 Innovation Awards.

In July 2022 an experimental installation of panels cooled by water was installed on a disused platform at Holborn tube station. If successful, this system could be rolled out to cool the platforms of operational deep-level lines.

=== Tube trains ===
Newspapers are often discarded onto the existing air vents behind seats, which increases the problem.

Conventional air conditioning was initially ruled out on the deep lines because of the lack of space for equipment on trains and the problems of dispersing the waste heat these would generate. Different systems were proposed to cool Underground trains, including the use of large blocks of ice inside the train. The blocks would have been in refrigeration units, preventing them from melting completely.

Air-conditioning will be introduced on the deep lines as part of the New Tube for London, which is planned to replace the existing fleet of the Piccadilly, with options for replacing the Bakerloo, Central and Waterloo & City line fleets.

=== Subsurface trains ===
In 2010 new S-stock trains were delivered to replace the A, C and D stock trains on the subsurface Lines (Metropolitan, Circle, Hammersmith & City, and District). These have standard air-conditioning, as the subsurface tunnels are large enough to displace the exhausted hot air.

=== More efficient braking ===
Conventional brakes on trains rely on friction to slow the train down, transforming kinetic energy into heat. Older dynamic brake systems likewise work by converting the kinetic energy into heat via electrical resistors. More modern trains feature regenerative braking systems that can feed the energy from braking back into the power supply, minimising heat generation. This has the additional advantage of reducing the amount of brake dust produced by the trains.
