= London Underground 2024 Stock =

Type of London Underground rolling stock

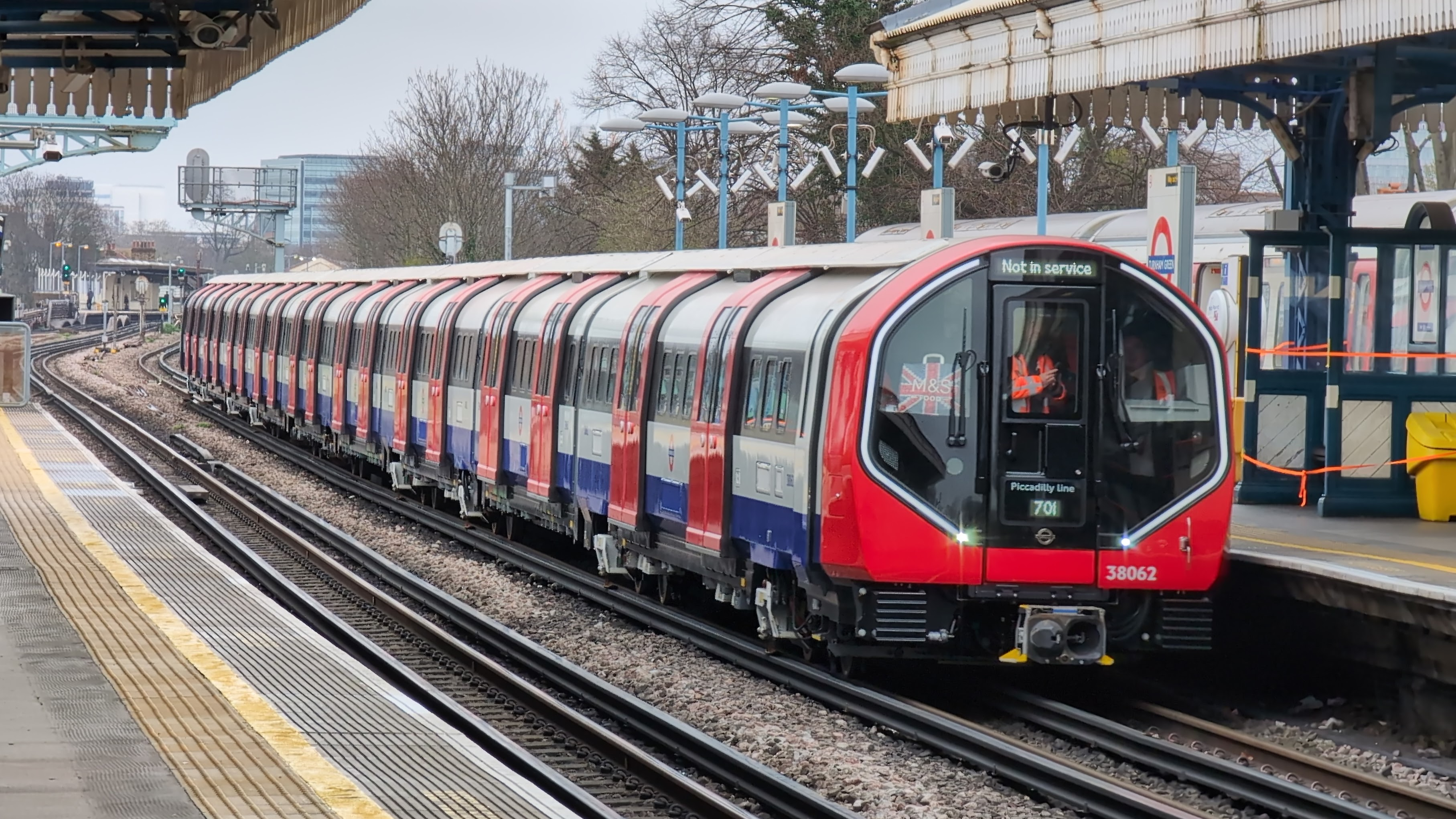
- 2024 Stock approaching Turnham Green during testing
- Stock type: Deep-level tube
- Manufacturer: Siemens Mobility
- Built at: Goole, England; Vienna, Austria
- Family name: Inspiro
- Replaced: 1973 Stock
- Constructed: 2022 (prototypes)–present
- Entered service: Planned between December 2026 and June 2027
- Formation: 9 cars per train
- Fleet numbers: 001 – 094
- Capacity: 1,042 per train (256 seated)
- Depots: Cockfosters; Northfields
- Line served: Piccadilly

Specifications
- Car body construction: Bionic lightweight aluminium
- Train length: 113.63 m (372 ft 9 5/8 in)
- Car length: 15.977 m (52 ft 5 in) (end cars); 13.938 m (45 ft 8 3/4 in) (intermediate cars); 9.978 m (32 ft 8 13/16 in) (intermediate cars without bogies)
- Width: 2.67 m (8 ft 9 1/8 in)
- Height: 2.844 m (9 ft 3 15/16 in)
- Wheelbase: 1.8 m (5 ft 10 7/8 in)
- Maximum speed: 100 km/h (62 mph)
- Weight: 155.401 tonnes (152.947 long tons; 171.300 short tons)
- Traction system: Siemens SIBAC G750 D570/210/210 M6-1 2-level IGBT–VVVF
- Traction motors: 16 × Siemens 1DB1619-0GA04 156 kW (209 hp) permanent magnet synchronous motor
- Power output: 2,496 kW (3,347 hp)
- Gear ratio: 6.095 : 1 (2-stage reduction)
- Acceleration: Starting: 1.4 m/s^{2} (4.6 ft/s^{2})
- Auxiliaries: SiC-MOSFET with SSPC
- Electric systems: Fourth rail, 630 or 750 V DC
- Current collection: Contact shoe
- UIC classification: 2′Bo′+0′+Bo′Bo′+0′+Bo′Bo′+0′+Bo′Bo′+0′+Bo′2′
- Bogies: Siemens SF1800
- Coupling system: Dellner
- Track gauge: 1,435 mm (4 ft 8 1/2 in) standard gauge

The London Underground 2024 Stock, known during development as the New Tube for London (NTfL), is a type of London Underground rolling stock built by Siemens Mobility at its facilities in Goole, United Kingdom and Vienna, Austria. It is part of the Siemens Inspiro family of metro and rapid-transport trains.

An initial batch of 94 nine-car trains has been ordered at a cost of £1.5 billion to replace the 1973 Stock trains on the Piccadilly line, with options for a total of 250 trains allowing replacement of all existing trains on the deep-level Bakerloo, Central and Waterloo & City lines. The first train was delivered for testing in London in October 2024. The trains are due to enter service between December 2026 and June 2027. The trains are planned to be operated by a train driver, with future potential for driverless operation.

== History ==
=== Background ===
In the late 1990s, the Labour government initiated a public–private partnership (PPP) to reverse years of underinvestment in London Underground. Under the PPP contracts, two private consortiums (Metronet and Tube Lines) would maintain, renew and upgrade London Underground infrastructure over a period of 30 years from 2003. As part of the upgrade work, new rolling stock was to be ordered.

Tube Lines planned to order 93 new Piccadilly line trains, which would enter service by 2014. In January 2007, Tube Lines started the procurement process, by asking whether train manufacturers would be interested in supplying them. Contract award was anticipated for 2008, with trains to enter service in 2014. By 2005, Metronet expected to deliver the 2009 Stock and S Stock trains in the 2010s, and planned to order 42 new Bakerloo line trains which would enter service by 2019.

However, Metronet was placed in administration in 2007 after cost overruns, and Transport for London (TfL) subsequently bought out the Tube Lines consortium in 2010, formally ending the PPP.

=== Feasibility and initial planning ===
Following the return to public ownership, TfL began planning the modernisation of underground lines not started by the PPP. This project would include the eventual replacement of trains, new signalling and other upgrades to the Piccadilly, Central, Waterloo & City and Bakerloo lines. This would complete the modernisation of Underground lines started with the formation of TfL in 2000.

In 2017, TfL said that existing trains on the Bakerloo and Piccadilly lines were approaching the end of their useful lives, and the 1992 Stock used on the Central and Waterloo & City lines was significantly less reliable than more modern rolling stock.

Replacement of these older trains with open gangway rolling stock – similar to the S Stock used on the Underground's subsurface lines – would increase passenger capacity, with new automatic signalling increasing capacity further. Although the use of open gangways was considered in the late 1990s, the Bombardier built 2009 Stock did not have open gangways. New trains would also have air conditioning, which earlier deep-level trains lacked.

In 2011, Siemens presented "EVO" – a conceptual articulated train with walk-through cars, that would be 30 tonnes lighter, consume 17 per cent less energy and have 11 per cent more passenger capacity than existing trains. A mock-up of the Siemens Inspiro design was exhibited at The Crystal between October 2013 and January 2014. Siemens also proposed building the new train in the UK, after being criticised for building the Class 700 Thameslink trains in Germany.

==== Potential of driverless operation ====
New trains would have the potential to operate automatically without a driver, which would save operating costs and prevent disruption during strikes. This unattended train operation is claimed to require the installation of platform screen doors, a substantial additional cost. The ASLEF and RMT trade unions that represent drivers strongly oppose the introduction of driverless trains, saying it would affect safety.

In 2020, a leaked TfL study found that the upgrade work required for totally unattended train operation – platform screen doors at stations and a safety walkway in tunnels – would cost around £7 billion, concluding that "the financial payback is negative". The study also indicated that automatically driven trains with a member of staff present on board (similar to the Docklands Light Railway) offered "reasonable value for money." However, the Department for Transport pushed for the introduction of driverless trains as a precondition of any future long-term funding deal for TfL. In 2024, the Mayor of London Sir Sadiq Khan confirmed that plans to introduce driverless trains in London would "progress no further".

=== New Tube for London / Deep Tube Upgrade Programme ===
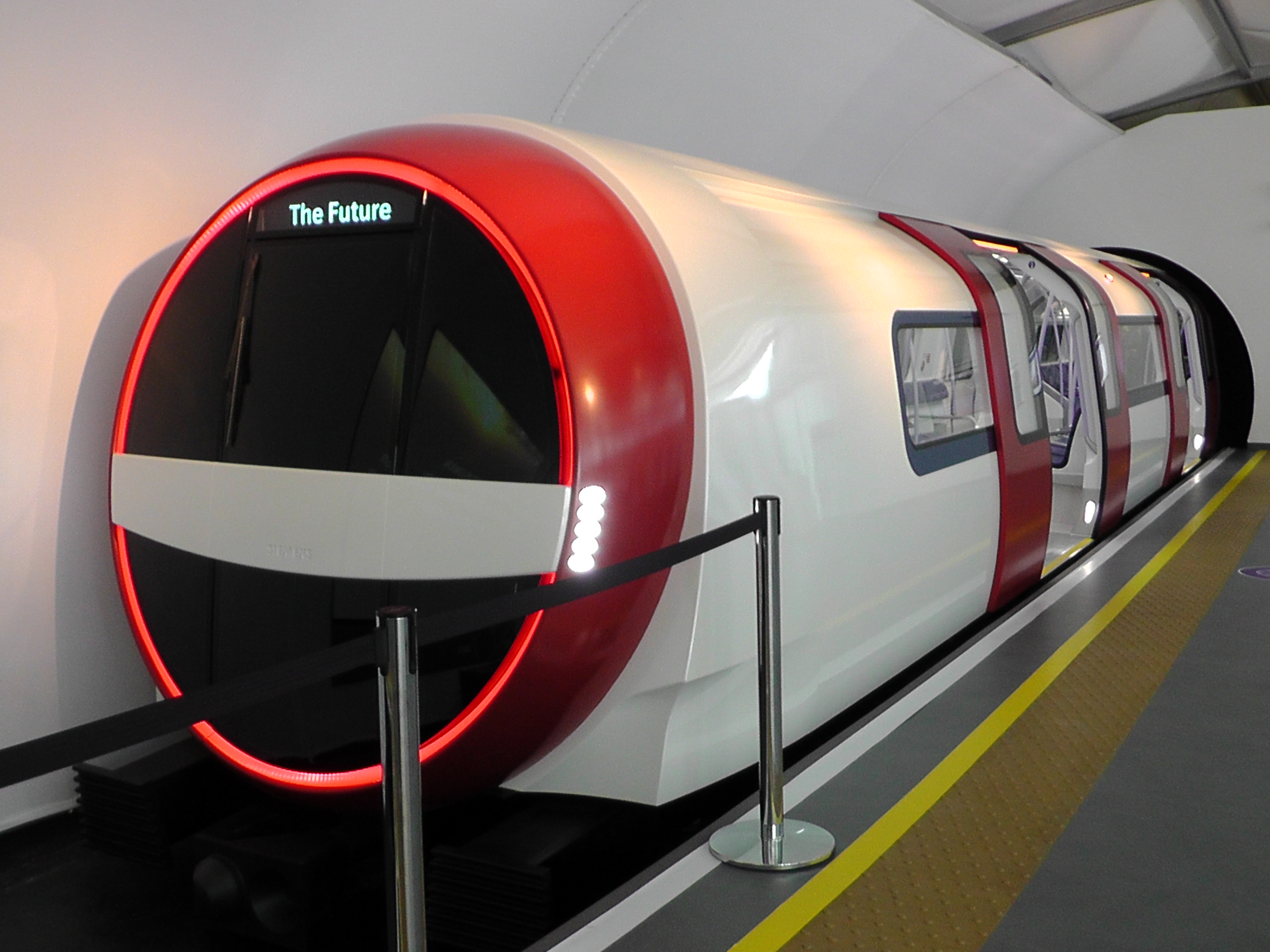
Mockup of Siemens' "evo" concept proposal

In early 2014, the project was named New Tube for London (NTfL) and moved from a feasibility stage to the design and specification stage. A TfL feasibility study showed that new generation trains and re-signalling could increase capacity:

NTfL capacity increase forecast
Line	Capacity increase	tph	Notes
Piccadilly	60%	36	
Central	25%	36	
Waterloo & City	50%	30	Requires track remodelling at Waterloo
Bakerloo	25%	27	

Overall, the project is estimated to cost a total of £16 billion, with a benefit/cost ratio of 4.2 to 1. The Piccadilly line would be the first to be upgraded, given the age of its rolling stock. Other lines would then be upgraded over a period of around ten years.

==== Bidding process ====
In early 2014, TfL invited train manufacturers to make expressions of interest in the Official Journal of the European Union. TfL also commissioned industrial designers PriestmanGoode to produce a conceptual design to be used by the train manufacturers. Unveiled in October 2014 to high acclaim, the design included several features not seen before on the deep level tube, including walk-through carriages and air conditioning.

In late 2014, TfL published a shortlist of manufacturers who had expressed an interest in supplying new trains – Alstom, Siemens, Hitachi, CAF and Bombardier. The invitation to tender for the trains was issued in January 2016. It was planned to award the contract in 2016, with trains entering service in 2023. During the tender period, Bombardier and Hitachi formed a joint venture (JV), and CAF chose not to submit a bid. Three bids (Alstom, Siemens, Hitachi/Bombardier JV) were submitted in September 2016. All bidders proposed to build the trains in existing or new UK factories. By 2017, the project had been renamed the Deep Tube Upgrade Programme (DTUP) – in light of the signalling, power and other infrastructure improvements delivered alongside new trains.

==== Contract award and future contract options ====
Since TfL could not afford 250 new trains and upgraded signalling, it decided to buy only 94 trains, for the Piccadilly line, and relegate future train purchases to contract options. In 2019, TfL raised £1 billion to buy the Piccadilly line trains by selling and leasing back Class 345 Elizabeth line trains.

In total, 250 trains could be ordered throughout the lifetime of the Deep Tube Upgrade Programme, comprising 100 trains for the Piccadilly line, 40 for the Bakerloo line, 100 for the Central line and ten for the Waterloo & City line. Future trains would be adapted to meet the requirements of lines, with the potential of active steering of bogies, and different numbers of cars per trainset as required.

In 2023, the Railway Industry Association requested that a decision to order Bakerloo line trains should be made as soon as possible, given the age of the 1972 Stock trains and to provide continuous work for the Goole factory. TfL's financial issues following the COVID-19 pandemic means that the order has not been made, with Mayor Sadiq Khan requesting investment from Government.

== Siemens 'InspiroLondon' ==
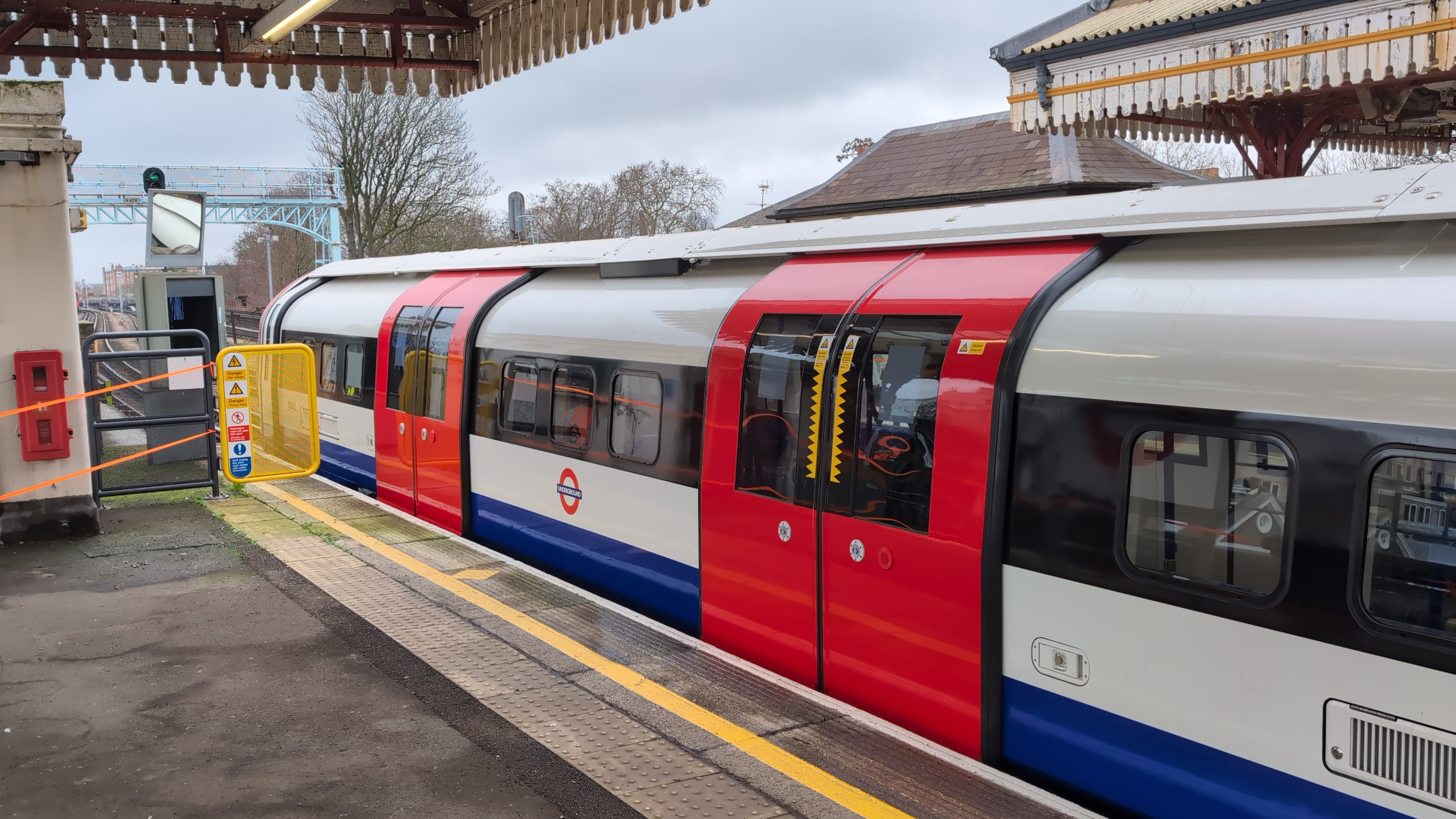
Front carriage of the 2024 stock

In June 2018, the Siemens Mobility Inspiro design was selected, with 94 trains ordered in a £1.5 billion contract. In July 2018, the award was challenged, unsuccessfully, in the High Court by the Hitachi/Bombardier JV; Siemens was awarded the contract in November 2018.

TfL said that the trains would be designed and built by Siemens Mobility at its planned £200 million new Goole factory in East Yorkshire, and later that 50 per cent of the trains would be built at an existing Siemens factory in Vienna, Austria, while the Goole factory was constructed. In July 2020, Prime Minister Boris Johnson visited the Goole site to mark the start of construction of the factory. Manufacturing of the trains in Austria started in August 2021. In January 2024, Siemens announced that the majority of the new trains would be manufactured in Goole, 80% rather than half as initially planned.

Despite the lack of new signalling, the purchase of new trains will still increase the capacity of the Piccadilly line, with 27 trains per hour at peak times by 2027. Trains will enter service with a human operator on board. However, new signalling could permit driverless operation in future.

Features of the new train include:

- 10 per cent increase in passenger capacity per train due to the open gangway design
- wider double doorways throughout, with no single-width doorways, allowing for faster boarding
- 20 per cent lower energy consumption compared to existing trains due to lighter aluminium construction, regenerative brakes and LED lighting
- air conditioning, for the first time on the deep-level tube
- equipped for driverless operation once lines have been resignalled
- LED screens to provide passenger information and advertising

The trains are 6.2 m (20 ft) longer than existing Piccadilly line trains (over body ends), and are composed of nine cars instead of six. The new trains consist of two driver-motor cars on each end, a key motor car in the centre, and four shorter intermediate cars, with bogies placed between each motor car. This design means that the train only has ten bogies instead of the twelve on a 1973 Stock train, giving space underneath the train to install equipment such as air conditioning. Siemens said the design was inspired by articulated trams. There are four wheelchair spaces in each train.

Each door has an LED light strip, turning green when the doors open and flashing red when they close. The trains are fitted with solid stick wheel flange lubricators and sanding systems. Seats are covered with a new moquette designed by TfL, named Holden, inspired by the station architecture of Charles Holden.

=== Delivery ===
Initially, deliveries were to begin in 2023 and entry into service was to begin in 2024, giving the rolling stock the name of the 2024 Tube Stock. By March 2021, the delivery schedule had slipped: the trains were then expected to enter service on the Piccadilly line in 2025, followed by improvements to stations and service levels in 2027.

Testing of the first train commenced at the Siemens Wegberg-Wildenrath Test and Validation Centre in Germany in mid-2023. A climate chamber was used to assess performance in different weather conditions, including temperatures from −15 to 40 °C (5 to 104 °F), a solar load of 600 W/m^{2}, ice, and wind speeds of up to 100 km/h, using a three-car formation.

The first train was delivered on the morning of 15 October 2024, having travelled from Germany via the Channel Tunnel. Testing in London was scheduled to begin in late 2024, with entry into service planned for the end of 2025. In June 2025, TfL announced that the trains would not enter service until the "second half of 2026", with The London Standard reporting that the delay was caused by "unexpected difficulties" when testing the train on London Underground tracks compared with the test track in Austria. TfL noted that all 94 trains would be in service "18 to 20 months" after the first train enters service.

In July 2025, TfL confirmed that the trains will be known as "2024 Tube Stock".

In February 2026, the rollout of the trains was delayed for a second time to a point between December 2026 and June 2027, while the project's cost was announced to have increased by £409 million to £3.4 billion.
