= Siemens Goole =

Rolling stock factory in the East Riding of Yorkshire, England

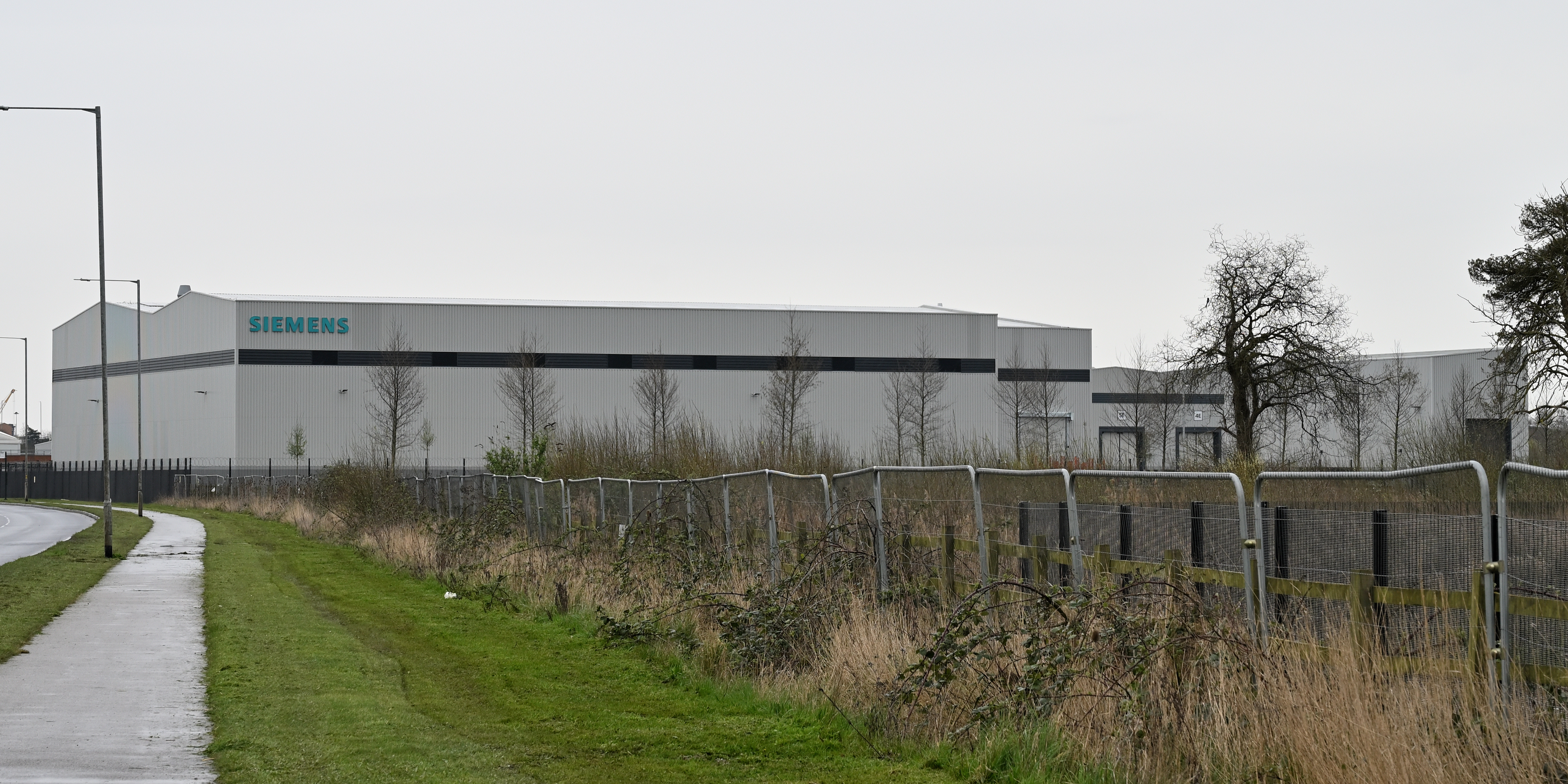
- Siemens Goole factory

- Location in Goole
- Built: 6 July 2020–
- Operated: April 2024-
- Location: Goole, East Riding of Yorkshire
- Coordinates: 53.6993°N 0.8937°W
- Industry: Rolling stock assembly
- Employees: 700 (projected)
- Architect: ARUP and AHR
- Area: 67 acres (27 ha)
- Owner: Siemens Mobility

Siemens Goole is a train factory located in Goole, East Riding of Yorkshire, England. Siemens Mobility assessed several sites in the United Kingdom before settling on Goole with an intent to build the plant if it were successful in gaining orders for new rolling stock. After a June 2018 announcement that Siemens had won the bid to build 94 London Underground New Tube for London trains for the Piccadilly line of the London Underground, Siemens confirmed it would go ahead with building the factory, though this was then subject to further delays as other rolling stock companies objected to Siemens being given the contract.

In November 2018, the High Court upheld the decision to award the contract to Siemens, but allowed the other train companies to pursue claims for damages. Groundwork on the site commenced in July 2020.

== History ==
During a period of sustained new train building for the United Kingdom rail network, Siemens announced in March 2018 that it would build a train factory in the UK if it was successful in acquiring new contracts for trains. Siemens have already built for the UK market with their Desiro family design which includes the class 185 DMUs, and the class 350 and 450 EMUs among others. The company already employs over 4,400 people in the United Kingdom in rail and other transport related roles, with eight purpose–built sites that provide rolling stock care. (Note: These are at: Glasgow Shields, London Acton, Manchester Ardwick, Northampton Kings Heath, Southampton Northam, York Leeman Road, Three Bridges, and Hornsey.)

After searching for a suitable site, Siemens acquired some land in Goole, in the East Riding of Yorkshire, stating that on winning orders, they would build a factory there. In June 2018, Siemens were awarded a £1.5 billion contract for 94 tube trains for the Piccadilly line. This triggered the plan to build the factory making Siemens the fourth train builder with an actual factory presence in the UK and the third new build factory within eight years. (Note: The Times article does not mention that this will be the fourth train factory in the UK; Bombardier have a plant in Derby, CAF have a plant in Newport and Hitachi Newton Aycliffe is already sending out Class 800 and Class 395 trains.) Previous to this, the Bombardier factory in Derby was the only UK based train builder.

The plant will cost £200 million and cover a 67-acre (27 ha) area and employ 700 people in its factory. 250 jobs will be created in building the factory with a further estimated 1,700 indirect jobs in the supply chain. The plant would use an existing siding in Goole that leads to a glass factory to provide access and egress for trains and will be sited on the Goole 36 industrial park adjacent to Junction 36 of the M62 motorway. There will be a manufacturing and commissioning site, offices, warehouses, stabling sidings and there is space for a test track to be installed, though what Siemens described as "extensive testing", would take place at their facility in Wildenrath, Germany. The buildings would cover 807,293 square feet (75,000 m^{2}) and the internal lines in the complex would total 7 miles (12 km). Groundbreaking for the factory happened in late 2019, with full opening planned for 2023–2024. Siemens announced in March 2024 that the plant would start building stock for the Piccadilly Line in April 2024.

In the £1.5 billion deal, the factory will build the trains in the Inspiro range already in use by other operators and is to replace old Tube stock from 1973. The contract details 564 cars to be built (which will be marshalled into 94 trains) with an option of a further 150 trains for the Deep Tube upgrade. The initial order is expected to be complete in 2026. 80% of the trains will be produced at Goole, up from the half previously planned, with some carriages being constructed in Vienna so that the order can be started before the factory at Goole is up and running.

The announcement of Siemens as the winning bid led to criticism of that decision by the then MP for Sedgefield, Phil Wilson. Wilson stated that it was a "slap in the face" for the workers at the railway rolling stock factory at Newton Aycliffe run by Hitachi, as they have the skills and ability to build the trains, whereas the Siemens bid has to wait on its factory to be built.

Siemens was one of four train builders invited to bid for the contract to provide rolling stock for the HS2 line. (Note: At the start of the tendering process, there were five companies; Alstom, Bombardier, Hitachi, Patentes Talgo and Siemens. As Siemens and Alstom were in talks over a potential merger, the field has narrowed to four. CAF, despite having a UK facility, were not in the running. In July 2018, an announcement that Bombardier and Hitachi would combine efforts for the HS2 bid, but not in other bids, led to the UK Government inviting CAF to tender for the bid to retain competition.) One of the stipulations of the contract was that if the new high-speed trains were not going to be built in Britain, then they should at least be assembled there. If Siemens/Alstom were successful, the trains could be assembled at Goole or at Alstom's plant at Widnes.

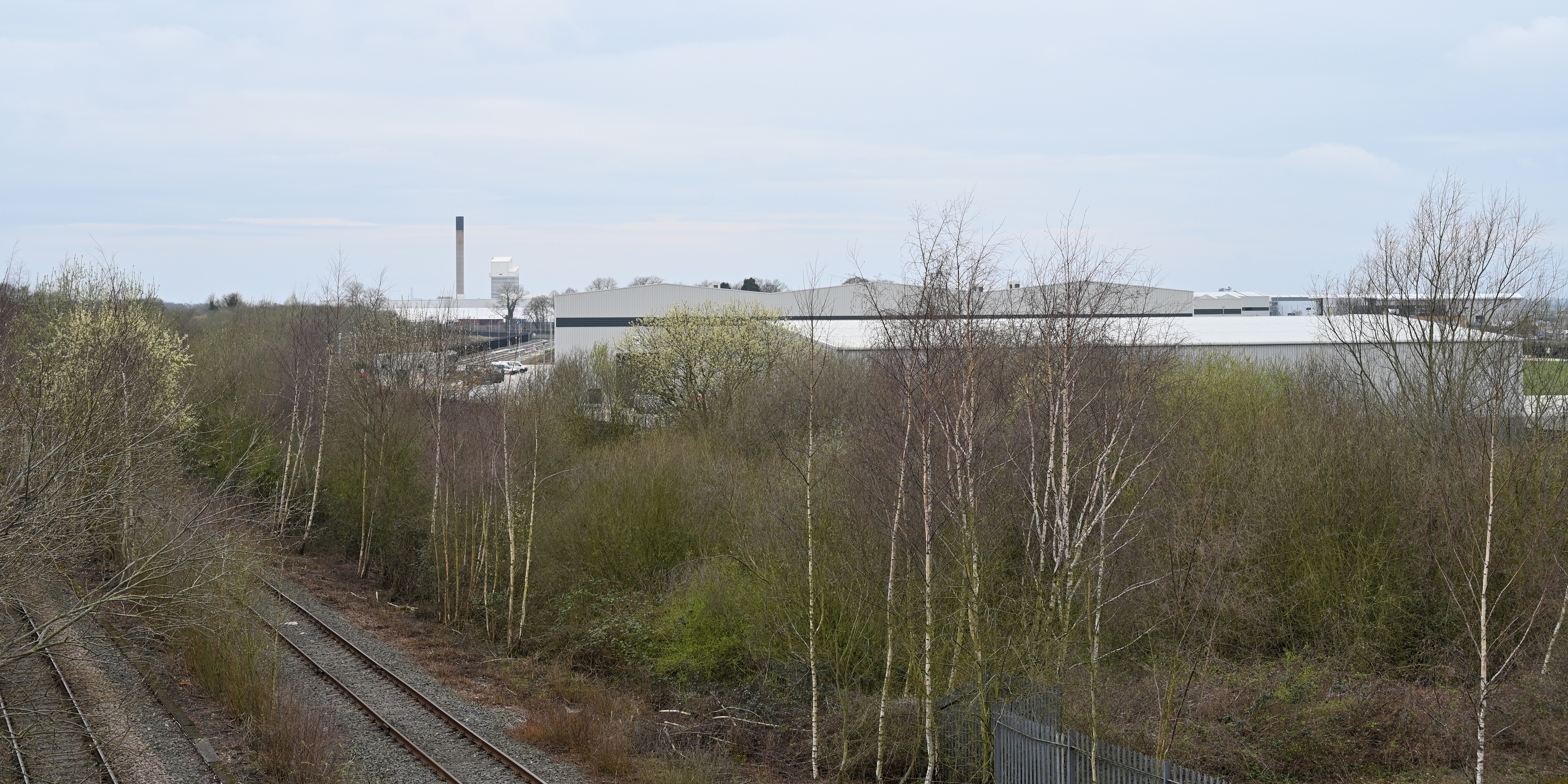
Siemens Goole factory looking west. The sidings can be seen above the parked road vehicles

In July 2018, the trainmakers Bombardier and Hitachi, who submitted a joint bid for the Deep Tube contract, filed papers with the High Court in London in an attempt to overturn the Siemens contract. For legal reasons, no comment was issued as to the nature of the complaint. In November 2018, the High Court gave Siemens the right to build the new deep tube trains as per the contract, but acknowledged that the other train companies involved were free to pursue claims for damages as he believed there was a case to answer. Whilst the contract is for 94 new trains, the company may extend this to 109 trains if Transport for London extend the contract. Siemens are also an interested party in bidding for other new tube train builds for the Bakerloo, Central and Waterloo & City lines. The new plant may also be used as a location to construct trains for HS2 should Siemens be successful in gaining that contract.

In April 2019, Siemens submitted their plans for the factory to East Riding of Yorkshire Council. This detailed a 104-acre (42 ha) site, of which 67 acres (27 ha) is "suitable" for development. At the same time, Siemens stated that their UK rolling stock engineering and commissioning team would move to the site and its Digital Operations Centre will also re-locate there. Outline planning approval was granted in July 2019, with groundwork expected in spring 2020.

COVID-19 related issues delayed the start on the factory, with groundwork commencing on 6 July 2020. In February 2021, a Leeds-base company (GMI), were awarded a £40 million contract for building the factory and installing the 2.8 mi (4.5 km) track connection to the main railway line near Goole. In February 2021, three carriages from a redundant Class 332 set, were re-vinyled and put on static display at the site. The carriages will be used to educate schoolchildren on visits and also host some training for apprentices at the factory.

Siemens Mobility awarded GMI Construction Group Plc a £45 million contract to build the new train manufacturing site at Goole and to install the track connection to the main railway line.

The factory was officially opened on 3 October 2024 by the Secretary of State for Transport Louise Haigh and the Mayor of London Sadiq Khan.
