= London Underground 1973 Stock =

Type of rolling stock used on the London Underground Piccadilly line

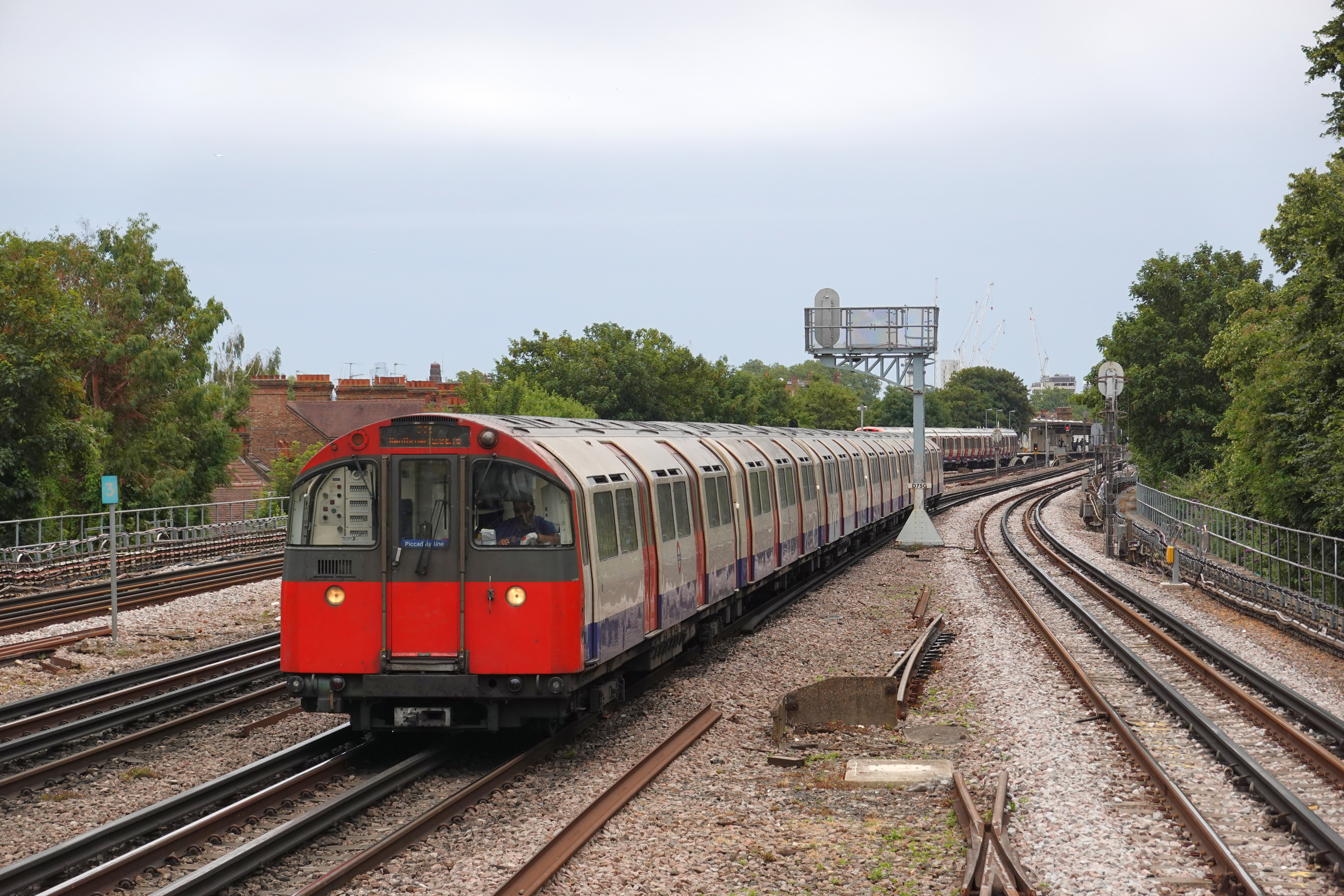
- Refurbished 1973 Stock train arriving at Turnham Green

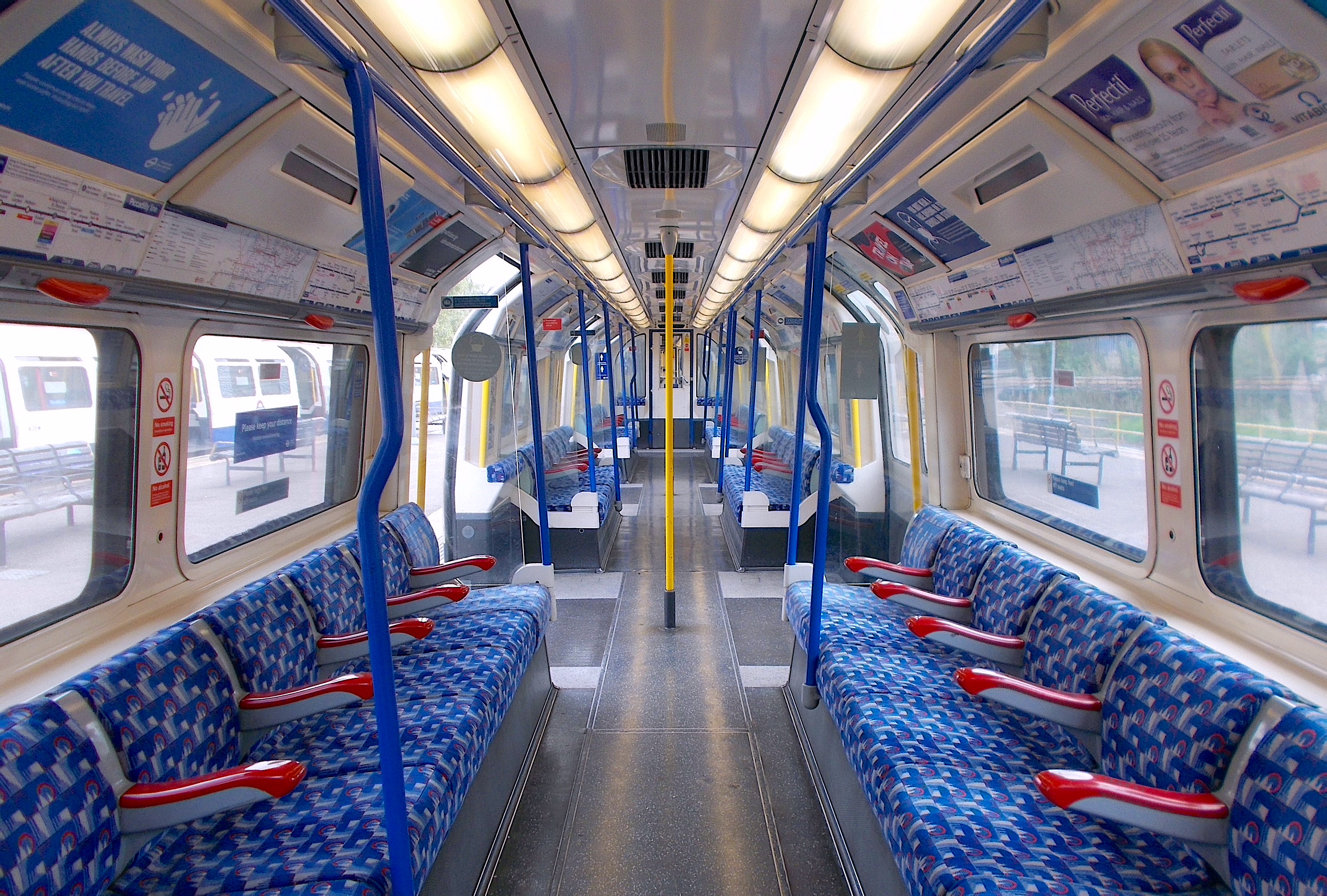
- The interior of a refurbished 1973 Stock car
- Stock type: Deep-level tube
- In service: 19 July 1975 – present
- Manufacturer: Metro-Cammell
- Built at: Washwood Heath, Birmingham, England
- Replaced: 1959 Stock
- Constructed: 1974–1977
- Refurbished: Bombardier Prorail (at Horbury railway works) 1996–2001
- Scrapped: 2025–present
- Number built: 175 units (87 1/2 trains)
- Number retired: 3 Units
- Number scrapped: 2 units and two cars (Note: One unit (204-604-404) was scrapped following a collision in Northfields depot in 1990 with UNDM 314 being scrapped at the same time, and another unit (166-566-366) was destroyed in the 7 July 2005 London bombings)
- Successor: 2024 Stock
- Formation: 3 cars per unit, 2 units per train
- Capacity: 684 per train (228 seated)
- Depots: Cockfosters; Northfields
- Line served: Piccadilly line

Specifications
- Train length: 106.810 m (350 ft 5.1 in)
- Car length: DM 17.473 m (57 ft 3.9 in); UNDM /T 17.676 m (57 ft 11.9 in)
- Width: 2,629 mm (8 ft 7.5 in)
- Height: 2,888 mm (9 ft 5.7 in)
- Maximum speed: 72 km/h (45 mph)
- Weight: DM 27.15 long tons (27.59 t; 30.41 short tons); UNDM 26.16 long tons (26.58 t; 29.30 short tons); T 18.16 long tons (18.45 t; 20.34 short tons)
- Traction system: Pneumatic single camshaft (GEC Traction)
- Traction motors: LT118 DC motor; (Brush Traction)
- Electric systems: Fourth rail, 630 V DC
- Current collection: Contact shoe
- Safety system: Tripcock
- Seating: Transverse
- Track gauge: 1,435 mm (4 ft 8 1/2 in) standard gauge

The London Underground 1973 Stock is a type of rolling stock used on the Piccadilly line of the London Underground. It was introduced into service in 1975 with the extension of the line to Hatton Cross, followed by a further extension to Heathrow Central in 1977. A total of 86 six-car trains were built.

The trains were built by Metro-Cammell between 1974 and 1977, and were refurbished by Bombardier Transportation between 1996 and 2001. They are amongst the oldest trains running in Great Britain, second only to the 1972 Stock on the Bakerloo line.

== History ==
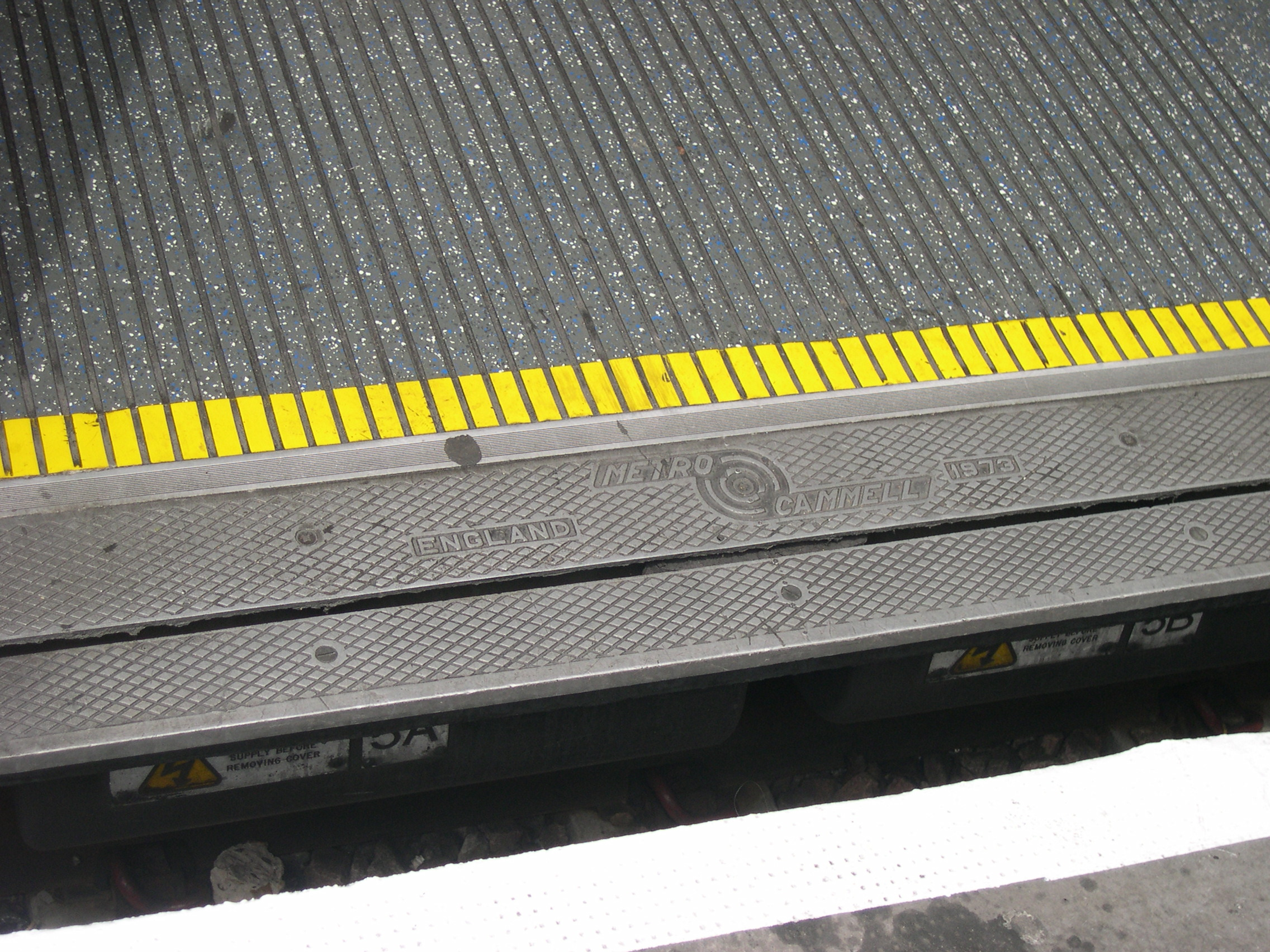
1973 Stock manufacturer's plate

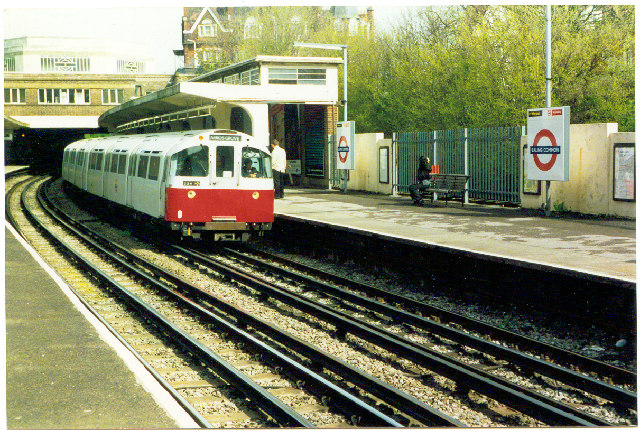
1973 Stock before refurbishment at Ealing Common in 1994

In the early 1970s London Transport placed an order for a new fleet of trains to replace the 1938 Stock and 1959 Stock vehicles which previously operated on the Piccadilly line. Built between 1974 and 1977 by Metro Cammell in Birmingham, the first unit entered service on 19 July 1975 and the last was introduced by 1977. The trains featured longer cars and larger door space than the previous units, being designed with additional luggage space for airport travellers.

The order was for 87 1/2 6-car trains, comprising 196 driving motor (DM) cars, 175 trailer (T) cars, and 154 uncoupling non-driving motor (UNDM) cars. Each train is made up of two 3-car units, and most units are single-ended, formed DM-T-UNDM. There are also 21 double-ended units, formed DM-T-DM, to provide additional flexibility and, formerly, to operate the Aldwych shuttle.

The initial order included two test units equipped with solid-state traction equipment and electronic control systems. These were double-ended units 892-692-893 (delivered 1977) and 894-694-895 (delivered 1979), and were known collectively as the ETT (Experimental Tube Train). The first unit was equipped by Westinghouse, the second by GEC. In order to provide additional units for the opening of the Heathrow loop, these units were converted to standard at Acton Works, entering service between 1986 and 1987.

One three-car unit (166-566-366) was damaged in a terrorist attack on 7 July 2005 and subsequently scrapped.

== Refurbishment ==
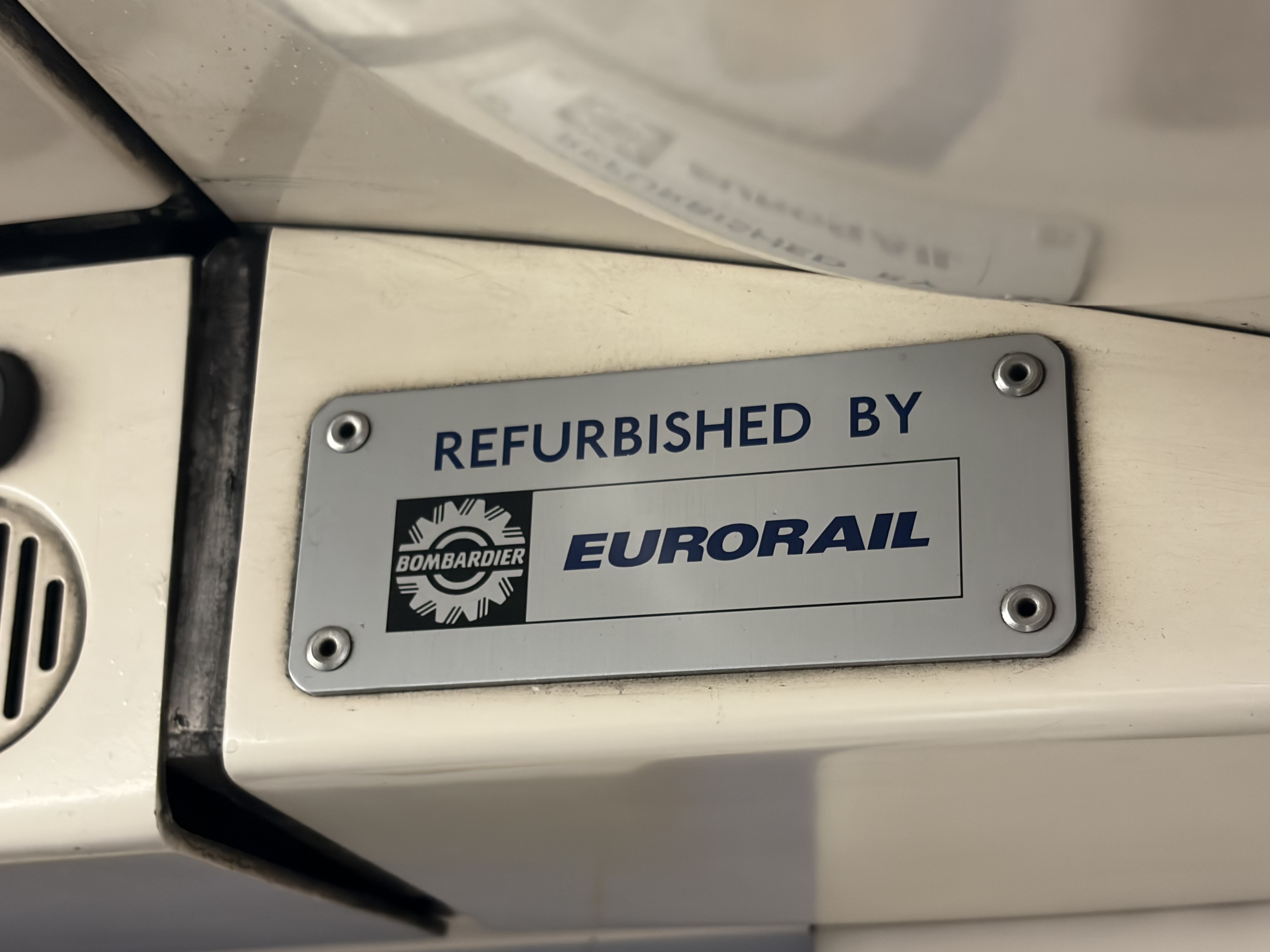
1973 Stock overhaul plate

Between 1996 and 2001, the entire fleet was refurbished by Bombardier Prorail at Horbury railway works. The interior was completely remodelled, with changes including the removal of transverse seating, replacement of the original wooden flooring with new floor material, replacement of straphangers with new grab rails, new enclosures for the ceiling ventilation fans, brighter lighting with new diffusers, installation of car-end windows and new perch seats in the centre of the cars, creating more luggage space for airport passengers.

The original unpainted exterior was painted in London Underground's corporate livery, and a new emergency detrainment system was fitted in the cabs. The external destination blinds were also replaced with LCDs, and these were subsequently replaced with new LED units in 2015.

Interior dot-matrix displays were also introduced around this time, with later refurbished trains having a more compact surrounding than earlier refurbished cars.

Automated voice announcements in the 1973 Stock as of today are notable for using the Julie Berry voice (used in various national rail services) as well as Adrian Hieatt for 'see it say it sorted' message. No other tube stock uses the Julie Berry voice. Both shall be phased out with 2024 Stock by a synthesised voice called 'Elloise'.

The first refurbished unit re-entered service in June 1996, with the final refurbished unit re-entering service on 10 July 2001.

== Future replacement ==
The Deep tube programme (DTP) originally covered the replacement of the trains and signalling on the Bakerloo and Piccadilly lines, and had been expanded to cover rolling stock requirements arising from the planned extension of the Northern line to Battersea, the eventual replacement of Central line trains, and proposed increased service frequency on the Northern and Jubilee lines. The EVO tube concept design, a lighter articulated train with walk-through cars, was introduced early in 2011.

Transport for London (TfL) had planned to replace Piccadilly Line trains in 2010 with the 2014 Stock to be delivered from 2015 onwards, with the two bidders of the contract; Alstom and CAF were bidded for the project. It was postponed, with the project being renamed to New Tube for London. In June 2018, TfL announced 94 nine-car 2024 stock trains to replace the 1973 Stock. As of February 2026, these are expected to enter service from December 2026 to June 2027, all 1973 Stock trains will be decommissioned by 2030.
