= Tottenham Court Road chiller =

Former refrigeration plant on the London Underground

Coordinates: 51.5162°N 0.1309°W

In the 1930s, London Transport Board installed an experimental refrigeration plant on the London Underground at Tottenham Court Road Underground station. The plant was operational between 1938 and 1949.

The experimental plant was built because temperature measurements through the 1930s showed that the Underground was steadily getting warmer. Although the temperatures were not at unsafe levels (peaks of 82 °F / 27.8 °C occurred at a few stations in summertime), the LTB perceived that if the trend continued, cooling in summer would be required at some time in the future, and it would be sensible to develop suitable technology.

The chiller used water as the working fluid. The evaporators consisted of indirect heat exchangers mounted in the platform tunnels which were fed water at just above 0 °C. The condenser was sited in the outflow air path of an existing tunnel cooling fan, which had been installed in a disused lift shaft at the station in 1933. The outgoing air going through the condenser was warmed by 2–3 °C, before being discharged to atmosphere.

Two descriptions of the cooling capacity exist. The first (from 1939) gives the capacity as "about half a million British thermal units per hour." The second (1982) states that it was "equivalent to melting approximately 51 tonnes of ice per day." In SI units, these are 146 kW and 197 kW respectively.

The experimental plant was not considered a success, mainly because the cooling it provided was at high cost. An extractor fan of the same cooling capacity ('cooling capacity' in the sense that a fan removes warm air in the tunnels and replaces it with cooler air from outside) used up one-eighth of the electricity of the experimental refrigeration plant. Not only that, such a fan was easier to maintain and cost less to install. In the austere post-war years, the electrical power drawn by the chiller could not be justified. It was used intermittently during the 1940s, and was decommissioned in 1949.

== See also ==
- London Underground cooling
