= London Underground infrastructure =

Railway infrastructure of the London Underground

The railway infrastructure of the London Underground includes 11 lines, with 272 stations. There are two types of line on the London Underground: services that run on the sub-surface network just below the surface using larger trains, and the deep-level tube lines, that are mostly self-contained and use smaller trains. Most of the lines emerge on the surface outside the Central London area.

The oldest trains currently in service on the Underground are 1972 Stock trains on the Bakerloo line. The Underground is electrified using a four-rail system, the DC traction supply being independent of the running rails. Planned improvements include new stations, line extensions and more lines with automatic train operation (ATO).

== Railway ==
The total length of railway on the London Underground is 400 kilometres (250 mi) and made up of the sub-surface network and the deep-tube lines. In 1971/72 it was re-measured in kilometres using Ongar as the zero point.

=== Sub-surface network and deep-level tube lines ===
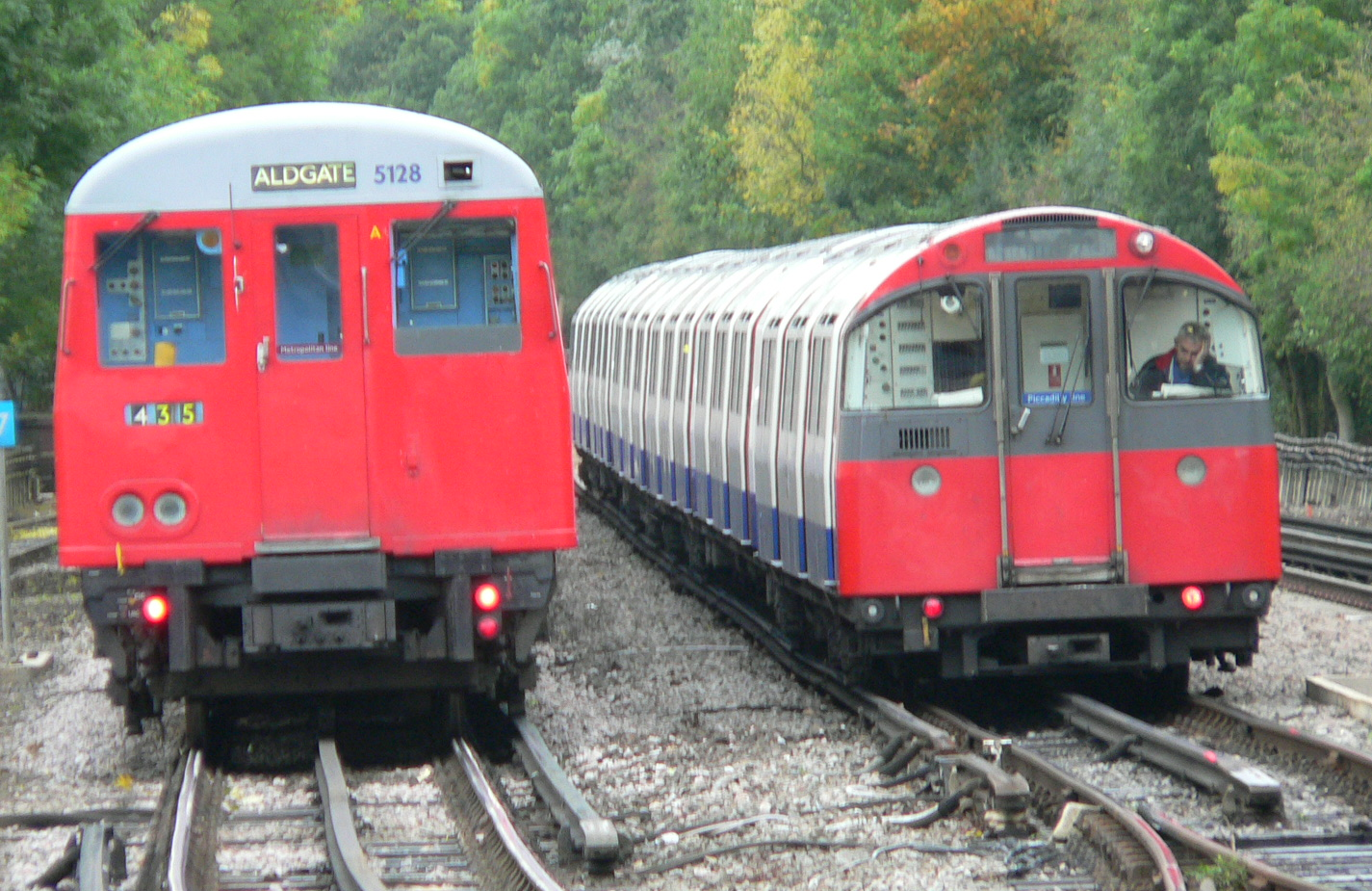
A sub-surface Metropolitan line A Stock train (left) passes a deep-tube Piccadilly line 1973 Stock train (right) in the siding at Rayners Lane.

The Circle, District, Hammersmith & City, and Metropolitan lines are services that run on the sub-surface network, that has railway tunnels just below the surface and was built mostly using the cut-and-cover method. The tunnels and trains are of a similar size to those on British main lines. The Hammersmith & City and Circle lines share all their stations and most of the track with other lines. The Bakerloo, Central, Jubilee, Northern, Piccadilly, Victoria and Waterloo & City lines are deep-level tube lines, with smaller trains running through two circular tunnels with a diameter of about 11 feet 8 inches (3.56 m), lined with cast-iron or precast concrete rings, which were bored using a tunnelling shield. These were called the tube lines. Since the 1950s the term "tube" has come to be used to refer to the whole London Underground system.

Many of the central London deep-tube line stations, such as those on the Central and Piccadilly lines, are higher than the running lines to help with deceleration when arriving and acceleration when departing. The deep-tube lines generally have the exclusive use of a pair of tracks. An exception is the Piccadilly line, which shares track with the District line between Acton Town and North Ealing and with the Metropolitan line between Rayners Lane and Uxbridge. The Bakerloo line shares track with London Overground Lioness line between Queen's Park and Harrow & Wealdstone.

There are 20 miles (32 km) of cut-and-cover tunnel and 93 miles (150 km) of tube tunnel, the other 55% of the system running above ground. Trains generally run on the left-hand track, although in some places, for example the Central line east of St Paul's station, tunnels are dug one above each other. The Victoria line has right-hand running between Warren Street and King's Cross St Pancras, allowing cross-platform interchange with the Northern line (Bank branch) between northbound and southbound trains at Euston.

A geographical map of the London Underground, showing the proportional spread of the network over the city (except for Amersham and Chesham stations, which are not in the field of view in the top left)

Six of the 32 London boroughs are not served by the Underground. All of these are south of the River Thames: Bexley, Bromley, Croydon, Kingston, Lewisham and Sutton. The borough of Lewisham used to be served by the Underground on the East London line – now part of London Overground – at New Cross and New Cross Gate. Of the boroughs through which the Underground lines pass, Hackney is served solely by Manor House station on the Piccadilly line on the very north-western boundary of the borough. For the most part however, some of the tube lines like the Central line skirt around the perimeter of Hackney rather than going straight through it. Richmond upon Thames is served only by Kew Gardens and Richmond stations on the District line, which shares its tracks with London Overground's Mildmay line between Gunnersbury and Richmond. The Royal Borough of Greenwich had no Underground station until North Greenwich station opened in 1999 on the Jubilee line extension.

=== Electrification ===
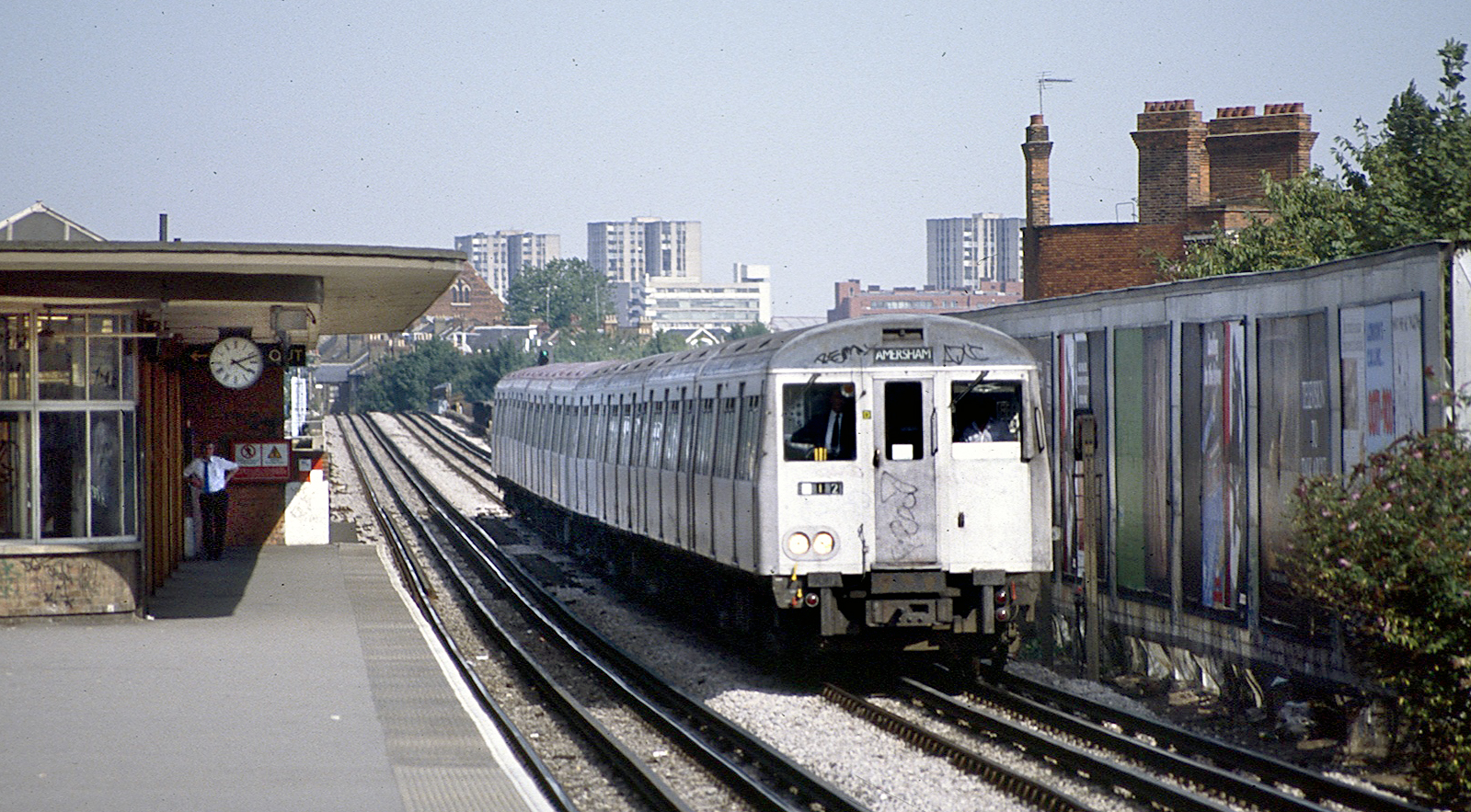
The older Metropolitan line train A Stock bound for Amersham

The lines are electrified with a four-rail DC system. The configuration and potential of the conductor rails varies across the network. As of 2020, there are three different conductor rail configurations:

- The original configuration is nominally 630 V with a −210 V centre conductor rail and a +420 V outside conductor rail. This is the default configuration wherever deep-level tube trains operate.
- Beginning in 2016, sections of the sub-surface network were reconfigured to a 750 V configuration (−250 V and +500 V rails). As of 2019, the entire sub-surface network uses this configuration except for Uxbridge to Finchley Road (via Harrow) as 1973 Stock and 1996 Stock (of the Piccadilly and Jubilee lines respectively) share the railway
- In areas where Underground and third rail rolling stock share tracks, the centre conductor rail is electrically connected to the running rails. This still results in a 750 V voltage, but in a 0 V/+750 V configuration. Lines configured in this manner include:
  - Between Gunnersbury and Richmond on the District line, shared with London Overground
  - Between East Putney and Wimbledon on a section of the District line that was transferred from British Rail
  - Between Queen's Park and Harrow & Wealdstone on the Watford DC line, served by Bakerloo line and London Overground trains

The four rail system was first used in the early 20th century. The isolated traction current return allowed a train's position to be detected using DC track circuits, and reduced any earth leakage currents that could affect service pipes, telephone cables, or cast iron tunnel liners.

The traction current has no direct earth point, but there are two resistors connected in series across the traction supply. The positive resistor is twice as great as the negative resistor, since the positive rail carries twice the voltage of the negative rail. The junction point of the resistors is earthed, establishing the reference point between the positive and negative rails by voltage division. The resistors are great enough to prevent large currents flowing through the earthed infrastructure.

=== Ventilation and cooling ===
The Metropolitan Railway's first line was built in the belief that it would be operated by smokeless locomotives and with little thought given to ventilation. Initially the smoke-filled stations and carriages did not deter passengers, the ventilation being later improved by making an opening in the tunnel between King's Cross and Gower Street and removing glazing in the station roofs, and the later extensions and the District Railway were built with stations in the open. With the problem on the original line continuing after the 1880s, conflict arose between the Met, who wished to make more openings in the tunnels, and the local authorities, who argued that these would frighten horses and reduce property values. This led to an 1897 Board of Trade report that reported a pharmacist was treating people in distress after having travelled on the railway with his 'Metropolitan Mixture'. The report recommended more openings be authorised but the underground sections of the Metropolitan and District railways were electrified before these were built.

Forced ventilation was not considered when the deep-tube Central London Railway opened in 1900, engineers considering that the movement of the electric trains would give sufficient air circulation. However, soon after opening there were complaints about a smell that the company couldn't explain, and by 1911 they had installed a system of fans injecting filtered air and ozone. Exhaust fans had been fitted at most stations when the Underground Electric Railways Company (UERL) opened its three tube lines in 1906–7, a maximum temperature of 16 °C (60 °F) in hot weather being advertised on the Bakerloo line. However, over time heat from the trains has warmed up the tube tunnels, and in 1938 approval was given to a £500,000 programme to improve the ventilation and an experimental refrigeration plant was installed in a lift shaft at Tottenham Court Road. More recently, temperatures of 47 °C (117 °F) were reported in the 2006 European heat wave. It was reported in 2002 that, if animals were being transported, temperatures on the Tube would break European Commission animal welfare laws. A 2003 study stated that air quality was seventy-three times worse than at street level, with twenty minutes on the Northern line having "the same effect as smoking a cigarette".

The main purpose of the London Underground's ventilation fans is to extract hot air from the tunnels, a system on the Jubilee line extension being designed to allow cooling of the tubes at night. Fans over the network are being refurbished, although complaints of noise from local residents preclude their use at full power at night. Following a successful demonstration of a heat pump in 2001, funds were given to the School of Engineering at London's London South Bank University to develop a prototype; work began in April 2002. A prize of £100,000 was offered by the Mayor of London during the hot summer of 2003 for a solution to the problem, but the competition ended in 2005 without a winner. A year-long trial of a groundwater cooling system began in June 2006 at Victoria station. The University's system comprised three fan coil units that use water that has seeped into the tunnels and is pumped from the tunnels to absorb the heat after which it is discharged in the sewer system. The scheme was one of the winners in the Carbon Trust's 2007 Innovation Awards. In 2012 air cooling units were installed on platforms at Green Park station using cool deep ground water and at Oxford Circus using chiller units at the top of an adjacent building. New air-conditioned trains have been introduced on the sub-surface lines, but was initially ruled out for the tube trains due to space being considered limited on the tube trains for air-conditioning units and that these would heat the tunnels even more. The New Tube for London, which will replace the existing fleet of the Piccadilly, Bakerloo, Central and Waterloo & City lines, is planned to have air-conditioning for the tube trains along with better energy conservation and regenerative braking.

== Stations ==
The Underground serves 272 stations. Fourteen Underground stations are outside Greater London, of which five (Amersham, Chalfont & Latimer, Chesham, and Chorleywood on the Metropolitan line and Epping on the Central line) are beyond the M25 London orbital motorway.

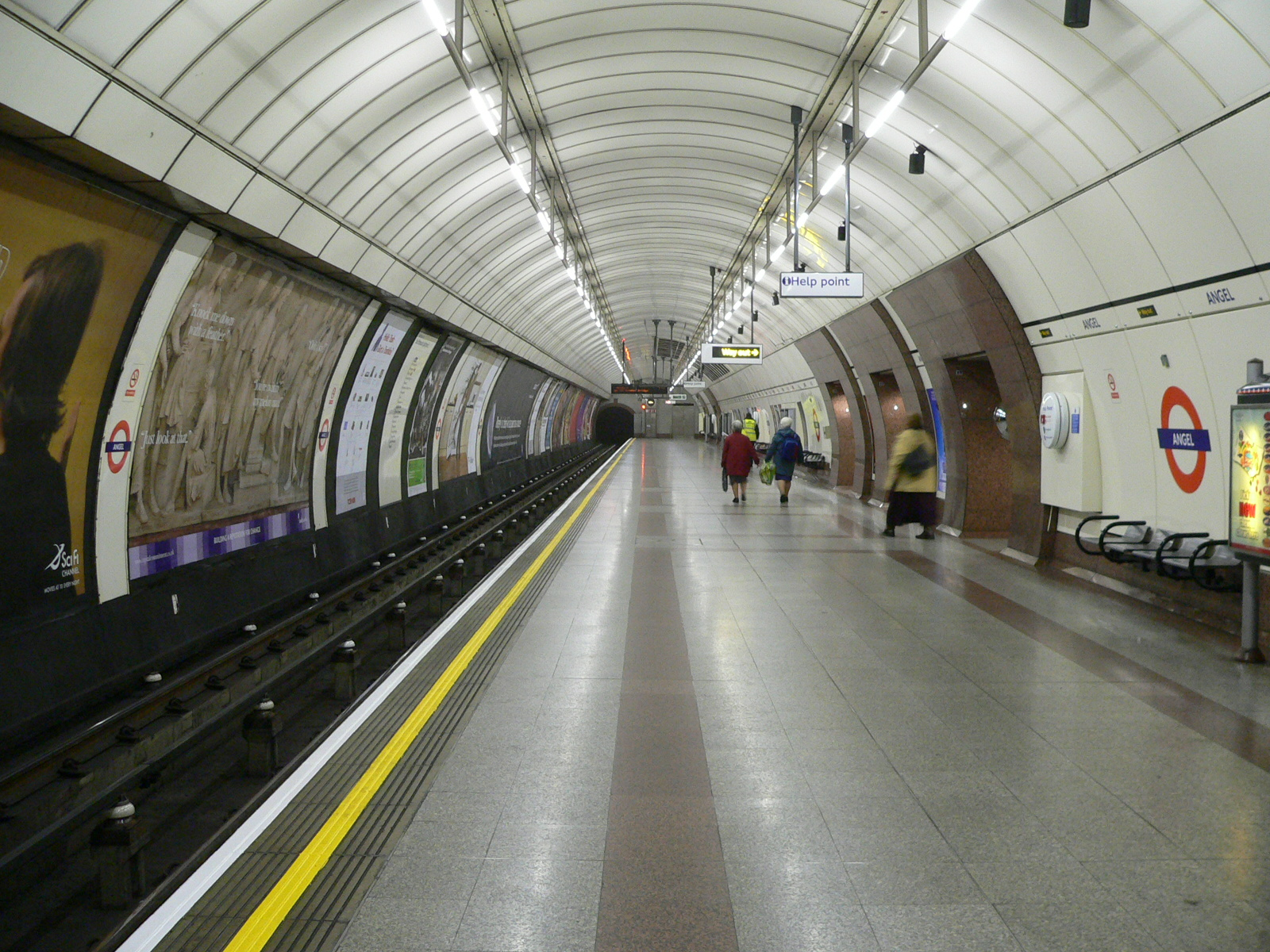
The southbound platform at Angel

The longest distance between two stations is 3.9 miles (6.3 km) between Chalfont & Latimer and Chesham on the Metropolitan line. The shortest distance between adjacent stations is the 330 yards (300 m) between Leicester Square and Covent Garden on the Piccadilly line. The station furthest south is Morden on the Northern line, 9.9 miles (16 km) from Moorgate. The station furthest east is Upminster on the District line, 16 miles (25 km) from Tower Hill. Chesham on the Metropolitan line is both the northernmost and westernmost station on the network, 29 miles (47 km) from Aldgate. Hampstead is the deepest station below the surface, at 58.5 metres (192 ft), as its surface building is near the top of a hill, and the Jubilee line platforms at Westminster are the deepest platforms below sea level at 32 metres (105 ft). The highest station is Amersham on the Metropolitan line, at 147 metres (482 ft) above sea level and the highest point above ground is the Dollis Brook Viaduct over Dollis Road between Finchley Central and Mill Hill East on the Northern line, 18 metres (59 ft) above the ground.

=== Lifts and escalators ===
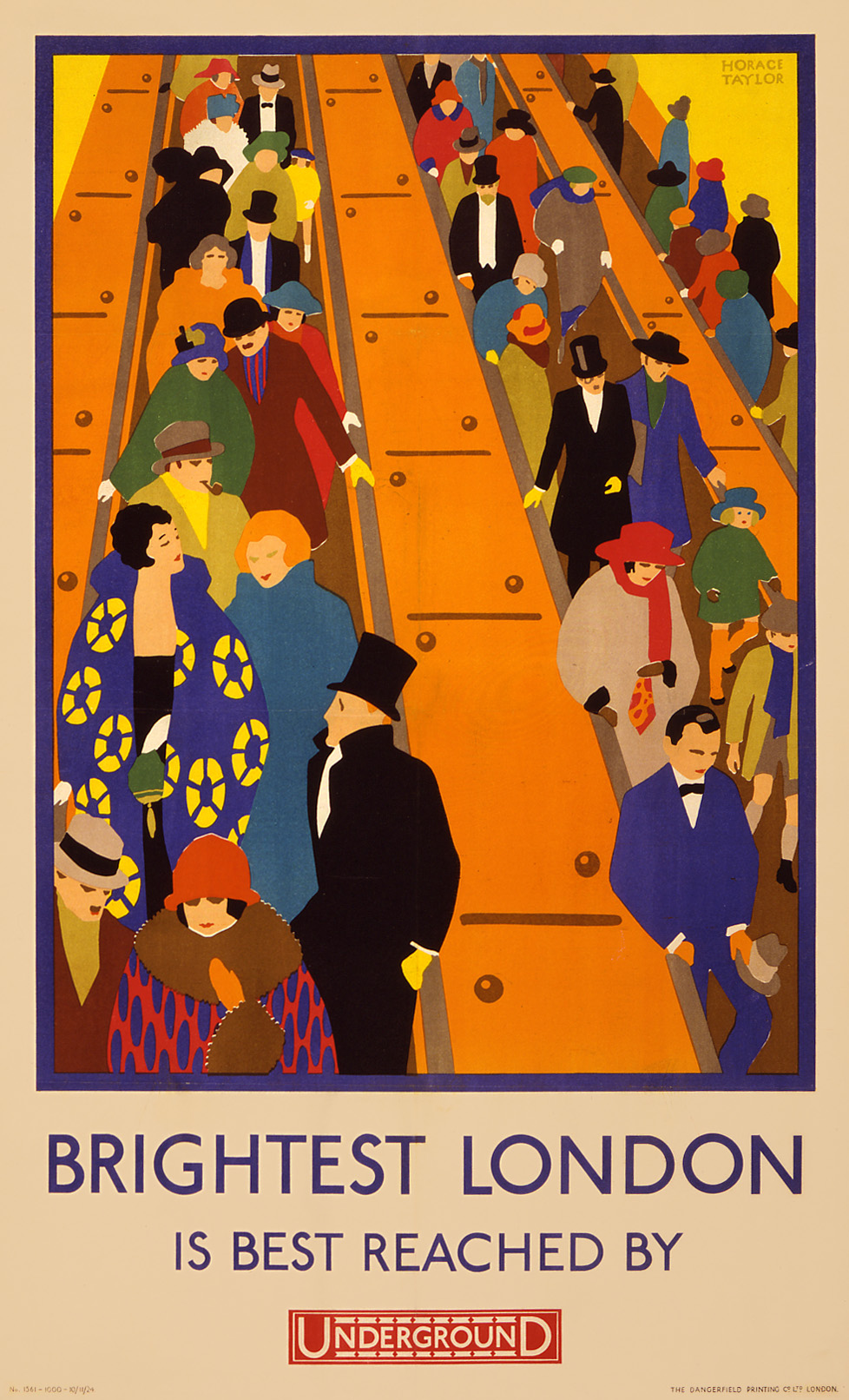
1924 Underground advertising poster

When the City & South London Railway opened in 1890 access to the platforms was by two hydraulic lifts, each capable of carrying 50 passengers. The later extensions had electric lifts and five were provided at Bank. Access to the Waterloo & City Railway in 1898 was by slopes and steps, and the Great Northern & City Railway (GN&CR) used both hydraulic and electric lifts. The Central London Railway provided electric lifts when it opened in 1900, and the opening of Bond Street station was delayed as the lifts were not ready. The UERL controversially imported 140 electric lifts from Otis Elevator Company in the U.S. for its three lines. Each carrying about 70 passengers, they were provided at every station except Gillespie Road (now Arsenal) and Embankment, where access was provided via the District's station. Hydraulic lifts were provided at Finsbury Park, powered from the GN&CR pumping station, and at Holloway Road there was an experimental spiral conveyor, but this was never used by the public. Each lift had a human operator, and at some quiet stations in the 1920s, the ticket office was moved into the lift, or it was arranged that the lift could be controlled from the ticket office.

The first escalator on the London Underground was at Earl's Court in 1911, between the District and Piccadilly platforms. It was advertised by signs and a porter shouting "This way to the moving staircase – the only one in London – now running." From 1912, all new deep-level stations were provided with escalators instead of lifts. The Otis Seeberger design of escalator, with a diagonal shunt at the top landing requiring a sideways step off, was used until 1924, when the first 'comb' type was installed at Clapham Common. In 1921, a recorded voice instructed passengers to stand on the right and signs followed in World War II. It is thought that people were standing on the right as the diagonal shunts at the top of the escalators made it easier to step off with the right foot. In the 1920s and 30s many lifts were replaced by escalators. Before World War II, an escalator installed at Sloane Square was the first connecting Circle line platforms to the street, but it was destroyed when the station was hit by a bomb in 1940. Due to wartime conditions, no escalators were provided when Highgate station on the Northern line extension opened in 1941; these were finally installed in 1957.

On 18 November 1987, the King's Cross fire at King's Cross St Pancras tube station killed 31 people. The subsequent public inquiry determined that the fire had started due to a lit match being dropped onto the escalator and suddenly increased in intensity due to a previously unknown trench effect. This was followed by the Fire Precautions (Sub-Surface Railway Stations) Regulations 1989 which required all wooden escalators on the Underground to be replaced with metal ones. From 1989, the wooden panelling on escalators was gradually replaced, and by January 1990, all wooden escalators in underground stations had been replaced. Treads were originally maple wood, then aluminium from 1963, and this had been replaced with plastic or rubber following an increase in serious injuries following falls. However, following the King's Cross fire, aluminium treads have been used on all escalators. In 1999, the opening of the Jubilee Line Extension increased the total number of escalators over the entire Underground network by almost half.

As of 2026, there were 451 escalators on the London Underground system with the longest, at 60 metres (200 ft), at Angel. The shortest, at Stratford, gives a vertical rise of 4.1 metres (13 ft). There are 202 lifts across the Underground, with 94 stations having step-free access from street to train. Major efforts have taken place to improve accessibility across the Underground, with the Jubilee Line Extension having lifts from opening in 1999, and key interchange stations such as King's Cross St Pancras, Victoria and Green Park becoming step-free. Work to increase the number of accessible stations further is underway. In October 2015, TfL installed the first incline lift on the UK transport network, at Greenford station.

== Lines ==
The London Underground comprises eleven lines.

London Underground lines
Name	Map colour	First operated	First section opened*	Name dates from	Type^{♯}	Length (km)	Length (miles)	No. Sta	Current Stock	Future Stock	Trips per annum in thousands	Avg. trips per mile (per kilometre) in thousands
Bakerloo line	Light Brown	1906	1906	1906	DT	23.2	14.5	25	1972 Stock	2024 Stock	111,136	7,665 (4,763)
Central line	Red	1900	1856	1900	DT	74	46	49	1992 Stock	2024 Stock	260,916	5,672 (3,524)
Circle line^{+}	Yellow	1884	1863	1949	SS	27.2	17	36	S Stock	N/A	114,609	4,716 (2,930)
District line	Green	1868	1858	1868	SS	64	40	60	S Stock	N/A	208,317	5,208 (3,236)
Hammersmith & City line^{+}	Pink	1988^{~}	1858	1988	SS	25.5	15.9	29	S Stock	N/A	114,609	4,716 (2,930)
Jubilee line	Silver	1979	1879	1979	DT	36.2	22.5	27	1996 Stock	N/A	213,554	9,491 (5,897)
Metropolitan line	Dark Magenta	1863	1863	1863	SS	66.7	41.5	34	S Stock	N/A	66,779	1,609 (1,000)
Northern line	Black	1890	1867	1937	DT	58	36	52	1995 Stock	N/A	252,310	7,009 (4,355)
Piccadilly line	Dark Blue	1906	1869	1906	DT	71	44.3	53	1973 Stock	2024 Stock	210,169	4,744 (2,948)
Victoria line	Light Blue	1968	1968	1968	DT	21	13.25	16	2009 Stock	N/A	199,988	15,093 (9,378)
Waterloo & City line	Turquoise	1898^{†}	1898	1898	DT	2.5	1.5	2	1992 Stock	2024 Stock	15,892	10,595 (6,583)
* Where a year is shown that is earlier than that shown for First operated, this indicates that the line operates over a route first operated by another Underground line or by another railway company. These dates are sourced from London Railway Atlas, by Joe Brown, Ian Allan Ltd., 2009 (2nd edition). ♯ DT = Deep Tube; SS = Sub-surface. + Passenger figures for both Circle and Hammersmith & City lines combined. The Avg. trips per mile figure has been calculated using a combined route length of 24.3 miles, sourced from Railway Track Diagrams Vol. 5, by Quail Map Company, 2002 (2nd edition); ~ Between 1863 and 1988, the Hammersmith & City line ran as part of the Metropolitan line. † Prior to 1994, the Waterloo & City line was operated by British Rail and its predecessors.

== Rolling stock ==
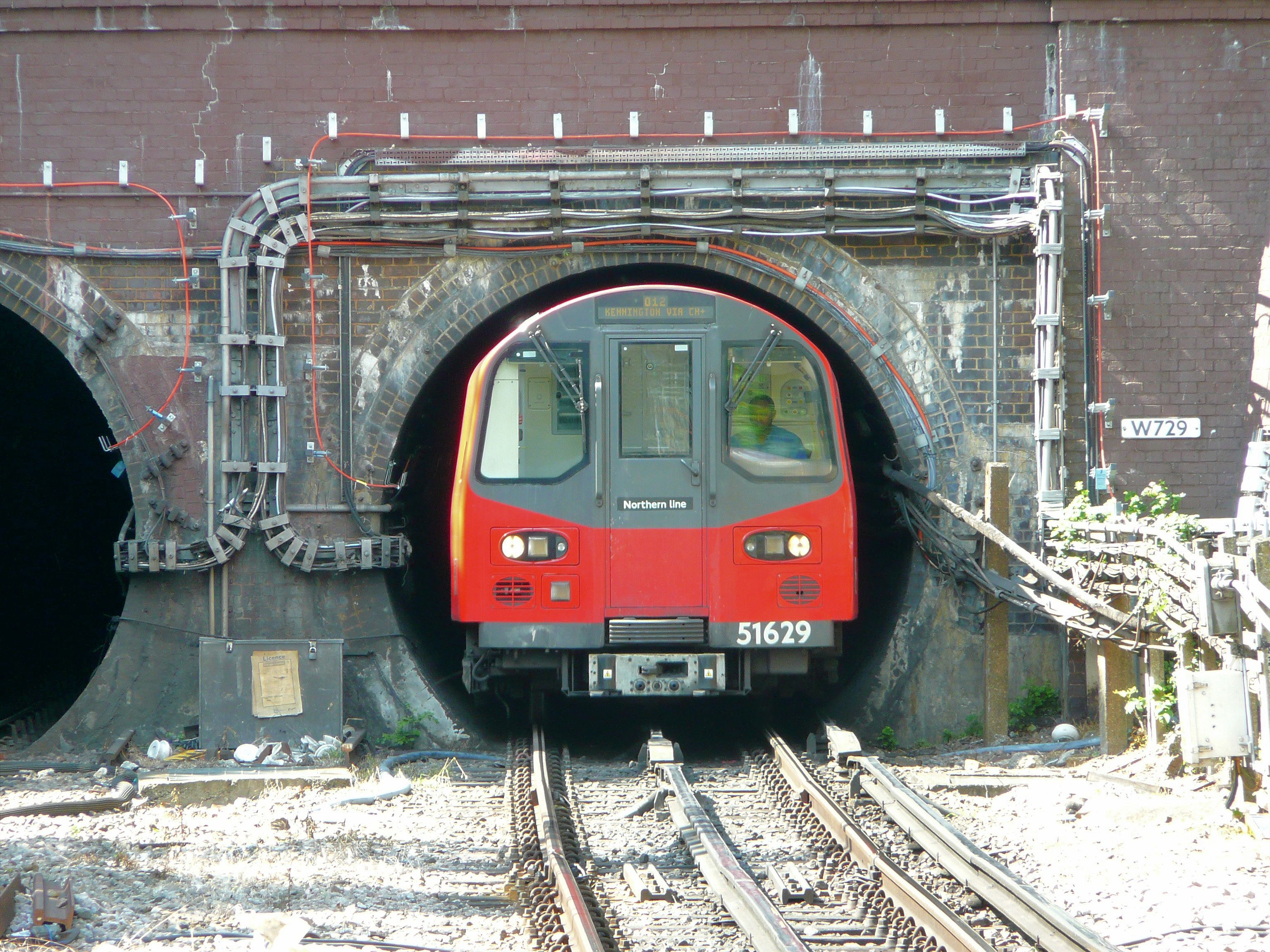
A Northern line deep-tube train leaves a tunnel mouth just north of Hendon Central station.

London Underground trains come in two sizes, larger sub-surface trains and smaller deep-tube trains. Since the early 1960s, all passenger trains have been electric multiple units with sliding doors and a train last ran with a guard in 2000. All of the lines use fixed length trains with between six and eight cars, except for the Waterloo & City line, which uses four-car trains. New trains are designed for maximum number of standing passengers and for speed of access to the cars and have regenerative braking and public address systems. Since 1999, all new stock has had to comply with accessibility regulations that require such things as access and room for wheelchairs, and the size and location of door controls. All underground trains are required to comply with the Rail Vehicle Accessibility (Non Interoperable Rail System) Regulations 2010 (RVAR 2010) by 2020.

Stock on sub-surface lines is identified by a letter (such as S Stock, used on all sub-surface lines), while tube stock is identified by the year of intended introduction (for example, 1996 Stock, used on the Jubilee line).

== Planned improvements ==
=== Line extensions ===
The Croxley Rail Link would involve rerouting the Metropolitan line's Watford branch from its current terminus at Watford station over the disused Croxley Green branch line to Watford Junction. Funding was agreed in December 2011. Construction work was due start in June 2014. However, in 2017 it was announced that further work was being postponed because of funding disputes.

There are suggestions that the Bakerloo line be extended to Lewisham, and then taking over services on the Hayes Line to relieve capacity on the suburban rail network. The London Borough of Hillingdon has proposed that the Central line be extended from West Ruislip to Uxbridge via Ickenham, claiming the extension would cut traffic on the A40 in the area.

=== Line upgrades ===
The signalling system on the Northern line was replaced allowing a capacity increase of 20 per cent by the end of 2014. Capacity can be increased further if the operation of the Charing Cross and Bank branches are separated. New S Stock trains have been introduced on the sub-surface (District, Metropolitan, Hammersmith & City and Circle) lines, and the track, electrical supply and signalling systems are being upgraded as part of the Four Lines Modernisation to increase peak-hour capacity. A single control room for the sub-surface network is to be established in Hammersmith and an automatic train control (ATC) system will replace signalling equipment installed from the 1940s.

Options for new trains for the Bakerloo and Piccadilly lines are being considered. The New Tube for London trains will replace the 1972 Stock and the 1973 Stock of the Bakerloo line and the Piccadilly line respectively.
