= Northfields Depot =

London Underground depot

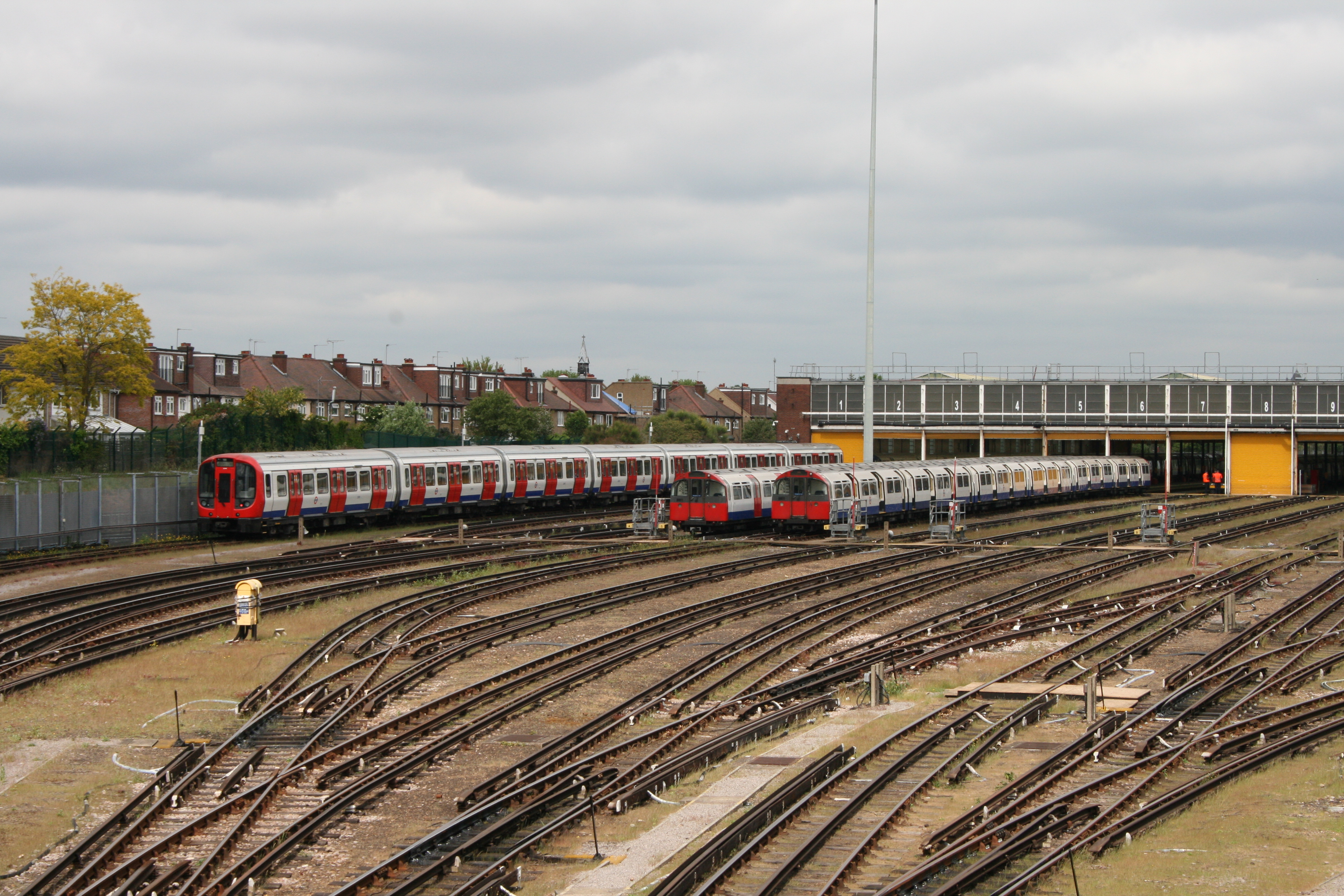
- Northfields Depot in 2015
- Interactive map of Northfields Depot

Location
- Location: Northfields, London, England
- Coordinates: 51.4973°N 0.3203°W

Characteristics
- Owner: London Underground
- Rolling stock: 1973 Stock

History
- Opened: 4 July 1932; 94 years ago

Northfields Depot is a London Underground depot located in Northfields within the London Borough of Ealing. It is situated between Northfields and Boston Manor stations on the Piccadilly line.

== History ==
Opened on 4 July 1932, Northfields Depot was built as part of the western extension of the Piccadilly line, necessitating the reconstruction of the existing Northfields station to be rebuilt nearer to South Ealing station.

Until 1964, the depot was also used by District line trains, which operated to Hounslow West.
