= London Underground rolling stock numbering and classification =

Rolling stock used on the London Underground and its constituent companies has been classified using a number of schemes. This page explains the principal systems for the rolling stock of the Central London Railway (CLR), the Underground Electric Railways Company of London (UERL), the District Railway (DR) and the Metropolitan Railway (MR). For information about individual classes of locomotives and other rolling stock, see London Underground rolling stock.

== Electric Multiple Units ==
The numbering and classification of electric multiple unit stock on the London Underground is usually related to the type of line that the trains are used on in the central area of the network.

Sub-surface lines were built using the cut-and-cover tunnelling method and use trains of similar size to those on the National Rail network. These are the Circle, District, Hammersmith & City, Metropolitan (and formerly East London) lines.

Tube lines are deep-level lines, built to a more restricted loading gauge using circular tunnelling shields or tunnel boring machines. These are the Bakerloo, Central, Jubilee, Northern, Piccadilly, Victoria and Waterloo & City lines. Outside of the central area, both types of trains run on the surface. (Note: In a number of cases, trains designed for tube lines run on surface routes originally built to mainline standards or for sub-surface trains: Central line west of White City runs on tracks built by the Great Western Railway, and north of Stratford by the Great Eastern Railway; Jubilee line north of Finchley Road runs on tracks built by the Metropolitan Railway; Northern line north of Highgate runs on tracks built by the Great Northern Railway; Piccadilly line west of Hammersmith runs on tracks built by the London and South Western Railway, the District Railway and the Metropolitan Railway.)

=== Unit Classification ===
The method of classification depends on the type of line the train operates on:

==== Tube Stock ====
Tube Stock is classified by the anticipated year of delivery at the time of ordering. (Note: This sometimes proves optimistic, for example the 1992 Stock did not become operational until 1993.)

This system was inaugurated by the London Passenger Transport Board (LPTB) with the 1935 Stock. The large number of broadly similar Tube trains built for the UERL during 1922-1934 were called (and are commonly still referred to as) Standard Stock (officially re-christened Pre-1938 tube stock upon rehabilitation), although there were many detail differences. They replaced the UERL's original Gate Stock (itself known as Standard Stock before the introduction of the then-new Pre-1938 tube stock), introduced for the opening of the Bakerloo, Piccadilly and Hampstead (Northern) lines and the replacement of the City & South London Railway's locomotive and carriage sets, the Watford Joint Stock of the Bakerloo, the Great Northern & City Railway's surface gauge stock, and the CLR's Tunnel Stock and Ealing Stock (which in turn comprised DMs of 1903 and 1915 vintage constructed to replace locos hauling trailers of 1900 vintage).

==== Sub-surface Stock ====
Sub-surface Stock is classified by a letter, usually issued sequentially, and which is sometimes followed by the last two digits of the year of delivery, e.g. G23 Stock . This system was commenced by the DR for its stock. When the LPTB was formed, the ex-Metropolitan Railway units were incorporated into this series (types MV, MW, T, V, VT and W). By 1960, most letters had been allocated, and the decision was taken to re-issue A (for the Amersham electrification) to the new Metropolitan stock. The next sub-surface types were built for the Circle and District lines, and the opportunity was taken to allocate C (for the Circle line) and D (for the District line) respectively, omitting B.

==== Types of Unit ====
On most lines, trains are formed from a pairing or triplet of units. Units are 'single-ended', where there is a driving cab at one end only, or 'double-ended', where there is a driving cab at both ends. In addition, some units have no driving cabs, and thus must always be included in the middle of a formation of units.

=== Car Classification ===
The different types of car used to make up electric multiple units are referred to by a series of codes, described below:

Code	Description
DM	Driving Motor car (with motors and a driving cab)
NDM	Non-Driving Motor car (motored, but with no driving cab)
UNDM	Uncoupling Non-Driving Motor car (as NDM, but with controls at one end to permit uncoupling and shunting, but not full driving facilities)
MS	Motor Shunting car (as NDM, but with provision to split from the adjacent MS as required in depots)
T	Trailer car (no motors or driving cabs)
CT	Control (or 'Driving') Trailer car (with a driving cab, but no motors)

==== Ends ====
On most lines, the end cars of units are described as 'A' end cars or 'D' end cars ('B' end until the 1930s). In general, the 'A' end is the north or west end and the 'D' end is the south or east, but the reverse applies on the Bakerloo line. On lines with a loop at the end that allows trains to turn round (e.g. at Heathrow Terminal 4 on the Piccadilly line and Kennington on the Northern line), this system cannot apply rigidly.

=== Car Numbering ===
Each car carries its own unique number (although many numbers below 10000 have been reused by newer cars after the withdrawal of older trains), and unit numbers are not applied. Although car numbers have been allocated in a variety of different series over the years, two basic principles can be identified:

- A-end cars have even numbers and D-end cars have odd numbers; cars will usually be renumbered if they are turned to the opposite end. This principle was applied by the DR and continued by the LPTB.
- Cars within a unit usually either share the same last two digits, or one end uses the next odd digit after the other end's even digit; frequently when cars are swapped between units they will be renumbered to maintain this approach. This principle was introduced by the LPTB.

==== 1931 Numbering Series ====
In 1931, the UERL began a major renumbering of all its multiple unit cars. The series was adopted by the LPTB in 1933 and renumbered stock inherited from the MR was incorporated into the UERL's series. The table below shows the number ranges used for the inherited stock and initially used by the UERL/LPTB for new stock (including the LPTB-designed M and N Stock and Q38 Stock DM cars - Q38 Stock trailers were allocated numbers in one of the new numbering series described later):

Number Series	Car Type	Line Type	Numbers for Inherited Stock	Numbers for New Stock	Numbers for Converted Stock
1-37	DM	Sub-surface ex-DR	Surviving unrefurbished B Stock (not renumbered in 1931)		
1000–1094	T	Sub-surface ex-DR	Surviving unrefurbished B Stock (not renumbered in 1931)		
1700–1717	CT	Sub-surface ex-DR	Surviving unrefurbished B Stock (not renumbered in 1931)		
2000-2999	DM	Sub-surface ex-MR	2200-2247 Hammersmith line stock 2500-2769 Main line stock (Note: Cars 2752 and 2707 were renumbered to 17000 and 20000 in 1946/1947 for testing as prototypes for A Stock. 17000 was renumbered 17001 following further modifications.); 2900-2940 Northern City line stock		
3000-3999	DM	Tube	3000-3069 and 3282-3688 ex-LER; 3912-3999 ex-CLR	3070-3281; 3689-3721	3723-3784 DM cars that changed ends
4000-4999	DM	Sub-surface ex-DR	4000-4390 and 4591-4645	4391-4437	4620-4642 (evens) ex-CT cars
5000-5999	CT	Tube	5000-5359 ex-LER; 5928-5999 ex-CLR		
6000-6199	CT	Sub-surface ex-DR	6000-6022		6100-6109 ex-DM cars
6200-6999	CT	Sub-surface ex-MR	6201-6264 Hammersmith line stock 6500-6735 Main line stock 6900-6919 Northern City line stock		6558/6559/6561/6562 ex-trailers 6736-6755 ex-hauled stock
7000-7999	T	Tube	7000-7059 and 7190-7570 ex-LER; 7901-7999 ex-CLR	7060-7189	
8000-8999	T	Sub-surface ex-DR	8000-8048 Composites; 8200-8258 ex-DM cars 8500-8535; 8700-8780 ex-DM cars	8049-8083 Composites; 8781-8785	8084-8095 Composites, ex-Third class 8786-8799 ex-DM cars 8801-8812 ex-Composites; 8813-8848 & 8900-8904 ex-DM cars
9000-9999	T	Sub-surface ex-MR	9200-9259 Hammersmith line stock 9400-9799 Main line stock 9582-9599 ex-DM cars 9900-9968 Northern City line stock		9479-9482 ex-CT cars 9800-9844 ex-hauled stock

Notes:

- Ex-MR hauled stock retained their original numbers as they did not conflict with any of the numbers allocated to the multiple unit stock; they were all numbered between 41 and 510 (511-519 were later allocated to cars converted from multiple unit to hauled stock).
- A 'Composite' car had both First and Third class seating. All Tube stock was Third class only; all ex-DR stock was Third class except those trailers identified as Composite. In the ex-MR ranges First class stock took the lowest numbers, then Composites, then Third class. The LPTB gradually declassified all stock to Third class, the process being completed in the early years of World War II.
- Some cars converted to Trailers after 1935 carried a '0' prefix to their numbers, as was applied to new-build trailer cars in this period. In some cases, such cars briefly retained their original DM numbers but with a '0' prefix before being renumbered into the appropriate range for trailers.

==== Later Developments ====
This standard number series proved to be short lived; from 1935 onwards a variety of different series have been used, so the current list of numbers looks rather random. The table below sets out the numbering systems used for each type of London Underground stock:

Number Series	Stock	Number Ranges	Allocation of Numbers
11-26	1986	11-16 DM; 21-26 NDM	Formed 1x+2x.
100-897	1973	100-253 DM; 300-453 UNDM; 500-696 T 854-897 DM (from double-ended units)	All cars in a unit had same last two digits, except double-ended units, which were formed in a series from 854+654+855.
1xxx 2xxx 9xxx	1956, 1959, 1962	1xxx DM; 2xxx T 9xxx NDM	All cars in a unit had same middle two digits: fourth digit even for A-end cars and odd for D-end cars.
3xxx 4xxx	1967, 1972, 1983	3xxx DM; 4xxx T	All cars in a unit had same last two digits: second digit even for A-end cars and odd for D-end cars.
39xx 49xx	1960	39xx DM; 49xx T	Fourth digit was even for A-end cars and odd for D-end cars; the original trailers (converted from Standard Stock) were later replaced by trailers converted from 1938 Stock, whose numbers did not correspond with the DM cars.
5xxx 6xxx	A & C	5xxx DM; 6xxx T	A Stock: four-car units, where all cars in a unit had same middle two digits, fourth digit even for A-end cars and odd for D-end cars; C Stock: two-car units, where both cars had same last three digits.
7xxx 8xxx 17xxx	D	7xxx DM; 8xxx UNDM; 17xxx T	All cars in a unit had same last three digits, except double-ended units, which were formed in a series from 7500+17500+7501.
10xxx 11xxx 12xxx 30xxx 31xxx 70xxx 90xxx 91xxx 92xxx	1935, 1938, 1949	10xxx DM (A-end); 11xxx DM (D-end); 12xxx NDM (T when prefixed by "0"); 30xxx UNDM (A-end); 31xxx UNDM (D-end); 70xxx T (ex-Standard Stock); 90xxx DM (nine-car unit A-end); 91xxx DM (nine-car unit D-end); 92xxx NDM (nine-car unit; T when prefixed by "0")	A-end & D-end DM cars had same last three digits; trailer numbers were not matched.
13xxx 14xxx	O & P, Q38 trailers	13xxx A-end (DM or T when prefixed by "0"); 14xxx D-end (DM or T when prefixed by "0")	A-end & D-end DM cars had same final three digits, trailer numbers were not matched. (Q38 Stock DM cars were numbered 4xxx in the original 1931 number series.)
1xxxx (2nd use)	2009	11xxx DM; 12xxx T 13xxx NDM; 14xxx UNDM	Eight car units formed from two four-car 'blocks' in which the last three digits of each car are the same; fifth digit even for A-end cars and odd for D-end cars.
2xxxx (1st use)	R	21xxx DM (A-end); 22xxx DM (D-end); 23xxx NDM	The third digit indicated the position of the car in the unit, A-end to D-end, from 1 to 4 in four-car units and 5 & 6 in two-car units. Each car in the unit had same last two digits.
2xxxx (2nd use)	S Stock	21xxx DM; 22xxx, 23xxx NDM; 24xxx MS; 25xxx NDM (de-icing)	In sets fitted with de-icing equipment, the 25xxx car replaces the even-numbered 23xxx car. Eight car units (third digit is 0 or 1) are formed from two four-car 'blocks' in each of which the last three digits of each car are the same; fifth digit even for A-end cars and odd for D-end cars. Seven car units (third digit is 3, 4 or 5) are the same except the odd-numbered 23xxx is omitted.
4xxxx	1956	40xxx DM (four-car A-end); 41xxx DM (three-car D-end); 42xxx DM (three-car A-end); 43xxx DM (four-car D-end); 44xxx NDM; 45xxx T (even in four-car, odd in three-car)	All DM and NDM cars in a unit had same last three digits. All cars were renumbered into 1xxx, 2xxx & 9xxx series when 1959 Stock delivered.
51xxx 52xxx 53xxx	1995	51xxx DM; 52xxx T 53xxx UNDM	All cars in a unit had same last three digits.
53xxx 54xxx	CO, CP	53xxx DM (A-end); 54xxx DM (D-end)	Ex-O and P Stock; 40000 added to original number.
65xxx 67xxx 91xxx 92xxx 93xxx	1992	65xxx DM; 67xxx NDM; 91xxx DM; 92xxx & 93xxx NDM	All cars in a unit had same last three digits; units in 6xxxx series are Waterloo & City line and retain their British Rail numbers.
75xxx	Standard	Trailers	Ex-DT cars; 70000 added to original number.
96xxx	1996	960xx & 961xx DM; 962xx & 963xx T 964xx & 965xx UNDM; 966xx & 967xx ST; 968xx & 969xx T (fitted with de-icing equipment)	All cars in a unit had same last two digits; unit number (1-126) is added to the car type (000=DM, 400=UNDM, 200/600/800=T)

== Notes and references ==
=== Bibliography ===
- Bruce, Graeme (1979) [1968]. Tube Trains Under London (2nd ed.). London Transport. ISBN 0-85329-095-4.
- Hardy, Brian (1997). "Unit Formations". London Underground Rolling Stock (14th ed.). Capital Transport. ISBN 1-85414-193-7.
- Hardy, Brian (2002). "Introduction". London Underground Rolling Stock (15th ed.). Capital Transport. ISBN 1-85414-263-1.
- Hardy, Brian (2002). "Unit Formations". London Underground Rolling Stock (15th ed.). Capital Transport. ISBN 1-85414-263-1.
