= Hammersmith Depot =

London Underground depot

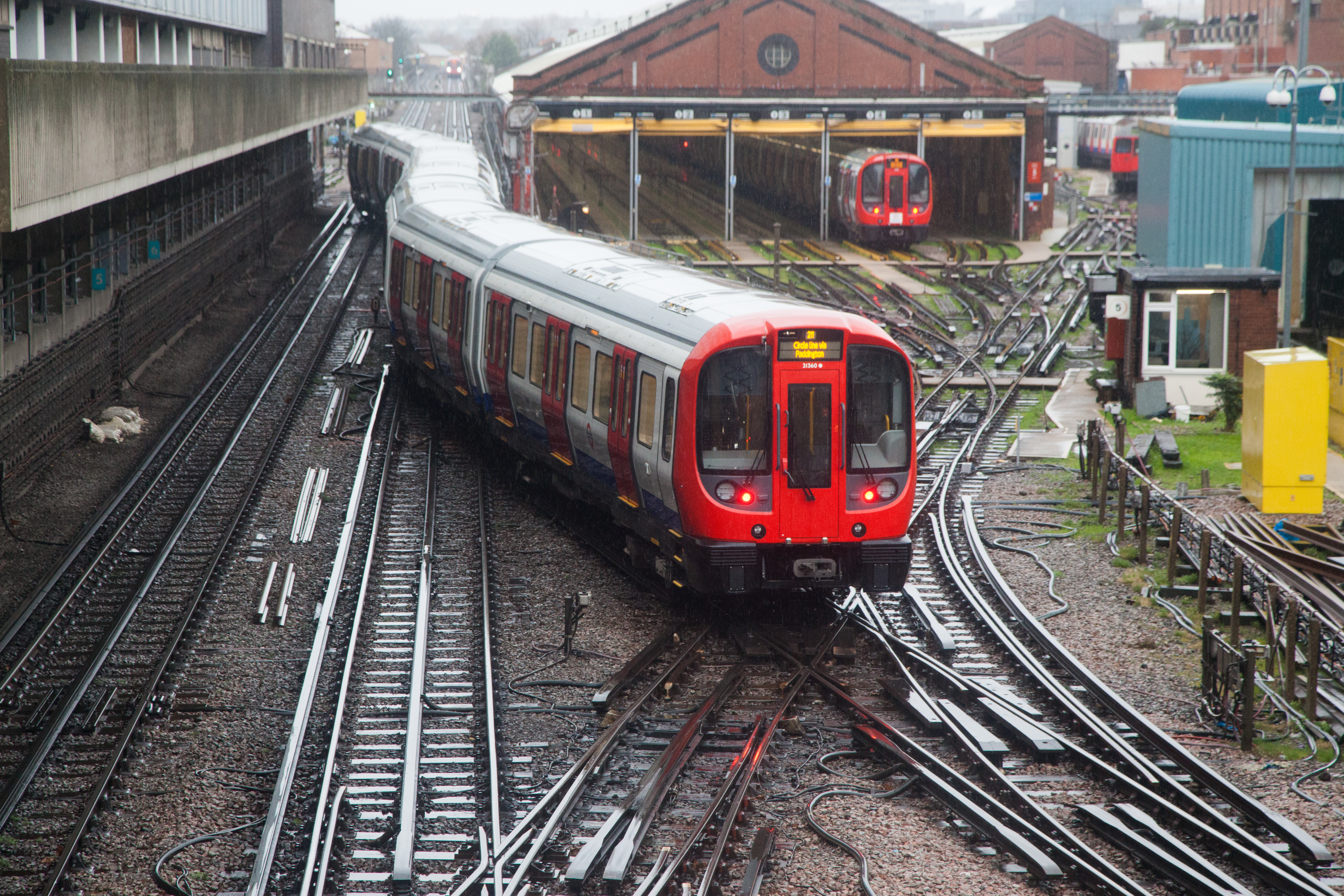
- Hammersmith Depot seen in the background in 2014
- Interactive map of Hammersmith Depot

Location
- Location: Hammersmith, London, England
- Coordinates: 51.4977°N 0.2253°W

Characteristics
- Owner: London Underground
- Rolling stock: S7 Stock

History
- Opened: 1906

Hammersmith Depot is a London Underground depot in Hammersmith. It is situated between Hammersmith and Goldhawk Road stations on the Circle and Hammersmith & City lines.

== History ==
The depot opened in 1906 for the electrification of the then-Metropolitan Railway (now Hammersmith & City line).

On 29 August 1991, three incendiary devices, attributed to the IRA, were discovered under a seat at the depot. There were no injuries.

The depot's sheds were extended and upgraded in 2013 to enable stabling of the new, longer S7 Stock as part of the Four Lines Modernisation project.
