= British Rail Class 499 =

British Rail Class 499 may refer to different items of railway rolling stock that have held the TOPS class 499 at different times:

- British Rail Class 499 (Luggage Van)
- British Rail Class 499 (London Underground)
