= Four Lines Modernisation =

London Underground upgrade projects

The Four Lines Modernisation (sometimes known as 4LM) is a series of projects by Transport for London (TfL) to modernise and upgrade the sub-surface lines of the London Underground, namely the Circle, District, Hammersmith & City and Metropolitan lines. The upgrades include new rolling stock, automatic signalling, and new track and drainage. New trains were delivered between 2010 and 2017, with automatic signalling completed on the Circle line in March 2022 and on the Hammersmith and City line in January 2023.

== History ==
Following the implementation of the London Underground Public Private Partnership (PPP) in 2003, the Metronet consortium became responsible for the infrastructure on the District, Circle, Hammersmith & City and Metropolitan lines. As part of the PPP, Metronet would deliver 190 new trains built by Bombardier Transportation and install new automatic signalling from Westinghouse Rail Systems. The first train was planned to enter service on the Metropolitan line by 2009, with all trains in service by 2015. All the trains would be built to the same design, saving on parts and maintenance costs for Metronet.

In July 2007, Metronet, the private consortium responsible for the infrastructure for the sub-surface lines, collapsed due to financial difficulties. TfL subsequently took over the contract for the new trains, and organised a new contract for the replacement of signalling.

In 2011, a £350m contract was awarded to Bombardier to replace the signals on the four lines with their Cityflo 650 system. This work would be completed by 2018. However the contract was terminated by TfL in 2014 due to delays, cost overruns and the complexity of the task. The decision by TfL to pay Bombardier £80m to end the contract was subsequently criticised by the London Assembly.

In 2015, the contract was awarded to Thales, with the replacement of signalling now costing £760m. It would also be delivered four years later than originally planned, in 2023.

== Rolling stock ==
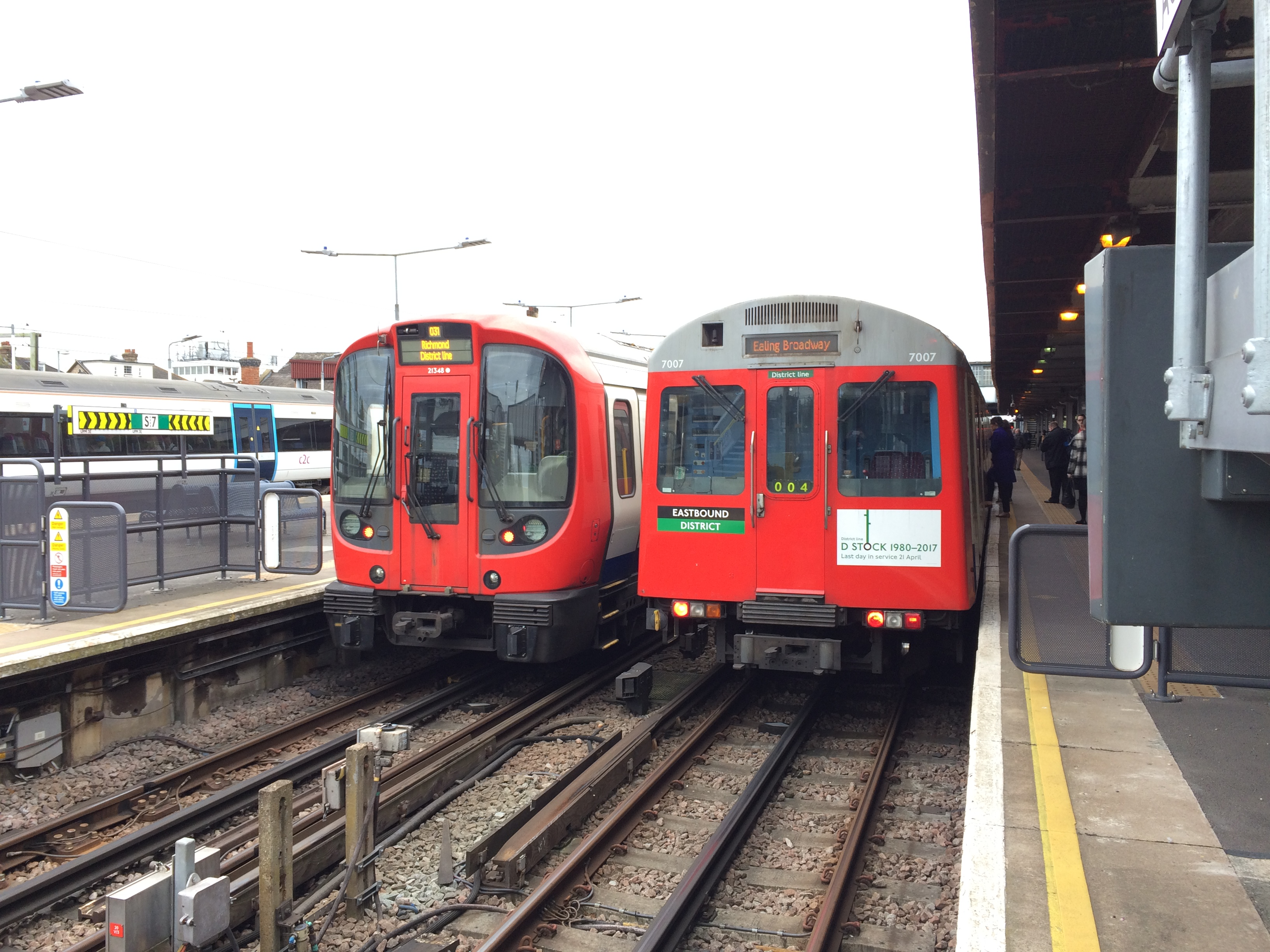
D78 Stock on its last day in service (right), next to its replacement, an S7 Stock unit (left).

As part of the upgrade, the entire sub-surface fleet was to be replaced. S7 and S8 Stock manufactured by Bombardier Transportation's Derby Litchurch Lane Works were ordered to replace the A60/62 Stock on the Metropolitan line, the C69/77 Stock on the Circle, District (Edgware Road to Wimbledon section) and Hammersmith & City lines, and the D78 Stock on the rest of the District line, all of which dated from the 1950's, 1960s and 1970s.

The order was for a total of 192 trains (1,403 cars), and formed of two types, S7 Stock for the Circle, District and Hammersmith & City lines and S8 Stock for the Metropolitan line. The main differences are the train lengths and seating arrangements, where the S7 Stock consists of seven cars in a longitudinal-only layout and the S8 Stock has eight cars with a mixture of longitudinal and transverse seating. New features that were not used on the previous rolling stocks include air-conditioning, low floors to ease accessibility, and open gangways between carriages.

The entire fleet was introduced by April 2017.

S Stock introduction
Line	Stock	First Unit introduced	Fully introduced
Circle	S7	2 September 2013	11 February 2014
District	S7	2 September 2013	21 April 2017
Hammersmith & City	S7	6 July 2012	11 February 2014
Metropolitan	S8	31 July 2010	26 September 2012

== Signalling ==
Part of the modernisation includes the introduction of communications-based train control (CBTC) to allow for automatic train operation (ATO) via Thales's SelTrac system. The grade of automation is GoA2, similar to other lines on the London Underground.

In order to upgrade the signalling, Signal Migration Areas have been created to allow for the gradual installation. Below is a list of the SMAs and their progress:

Signal Migration Areas
SMA	From	To	Line(s)	Status	Date
0.5	Hammersmith	Latimer Road	Circle and Hammersmith & City	Completed	March 2019
1	Latimer Road	Paddington	Circle and Hammersmith & City	Completed	September 2019
2	Paddington & Finchley Road	Euston Square	Circle, District, Hammersmith & City and Metropolitan	Completed	September 2019
3	Euston Square	Monument & Stepney Green	Circle, District, Hammersmith & City and Metropolitan	Completed	March 2021
4	Monument	Sloane Square	Circle & District	Completed	April 2021
5	Sloane Square	Barons Court, Fulham Broadway, Olympia & Paddington	Circle and District	Completed	March 2022
6	Stepney Green	Becontree	District and Hammersmith & City	Completed	January 2023
7	Becontree	Upminster	District	Completed	March 2023
8	Finchley Road	Preston Road	Metropolitan	Completed	1 June 2025
9	Preston Road	West Harrow; Moor Park	Metropolitan	Planned	2nd half-2026 (TBC)
10	Barons Court	Stamford Brook	District	Completed	August 2026
11 (Note: For various reasons including funding and the technical difficulties with sharing tracks with National Rail and the Piccadilly line, SMAs 10-12 were scaled back until further notice.)	Stamford Brook	Richmond & Ealing Broadway	District	Cancelled	until further notice
12	Fulham Broadway	East Putney	District	Completed	August 2026
13	Moor Park	Watford; Amersham; Chesham	Metropolitan	Planned	2nd half 2027 (TBC)
14	West Harrow	Uxbridge	Metropolitan	Planned	2028 (TBC)

As a result of SMA 5 being installed, the Circle line began running entirely under ATO and after the completion of SMA 6 the Hammersmith & City line also now runs completely under ATO. For various reasons including funding and the technical difficulties with sharing tracks with National Rail and the Piccadilly line, SMAs 10-12 were scaled back until further notice.

Originally the SMA were planned as follows:

Signal Migration Areas
SMA	From	To	Line(s)
10	Barons Court	Richmond & Chiswick Park	District
11	Chiswick Park	Ealing Broadway	District
12	Fulham Broadway	Wimbledon	District
