= London Underground 1972 Stock =

Type of rolling stock used on the Bakerloo line of the London Underground

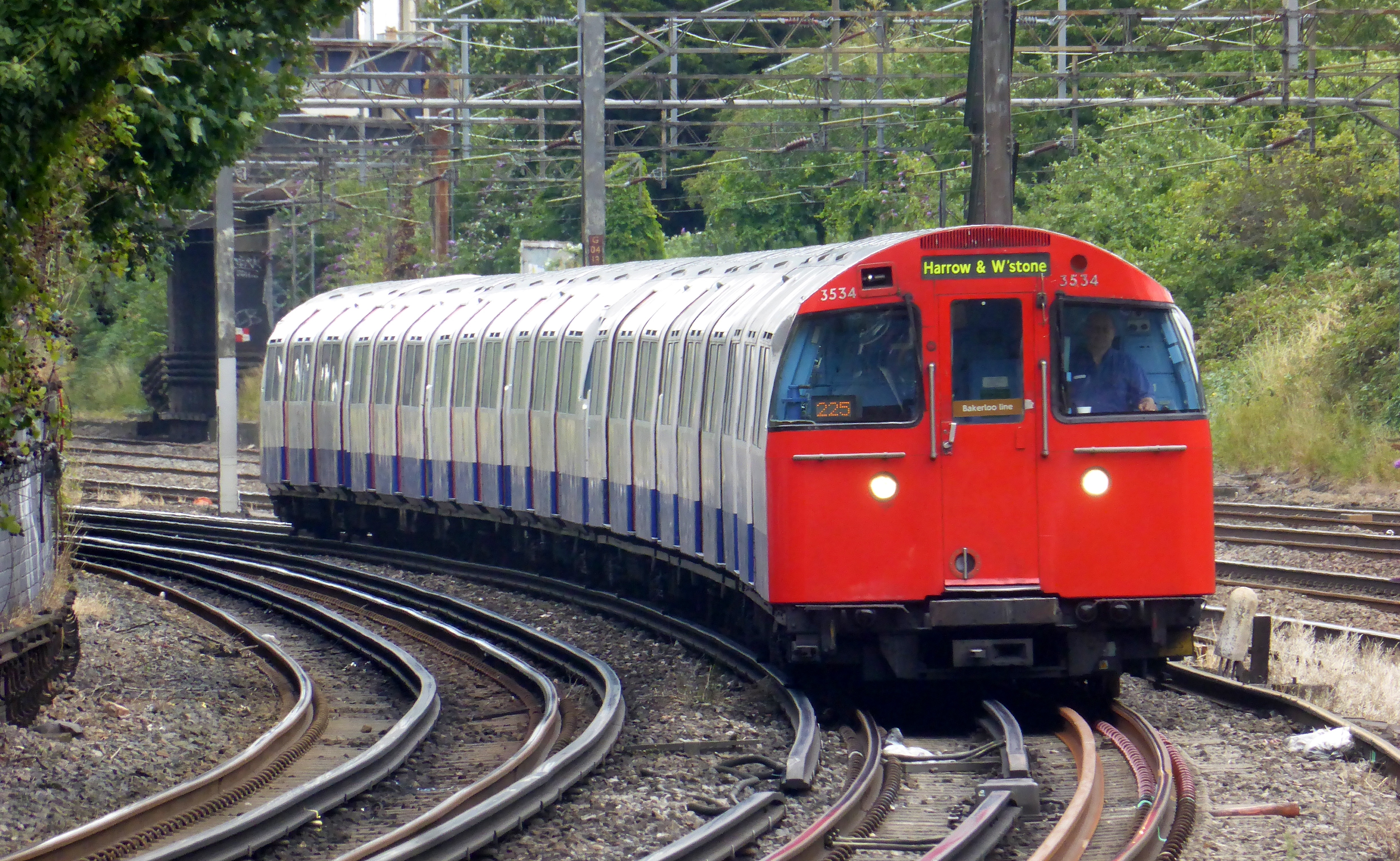
- Refurbished Bakerloo line 1972 Stock train

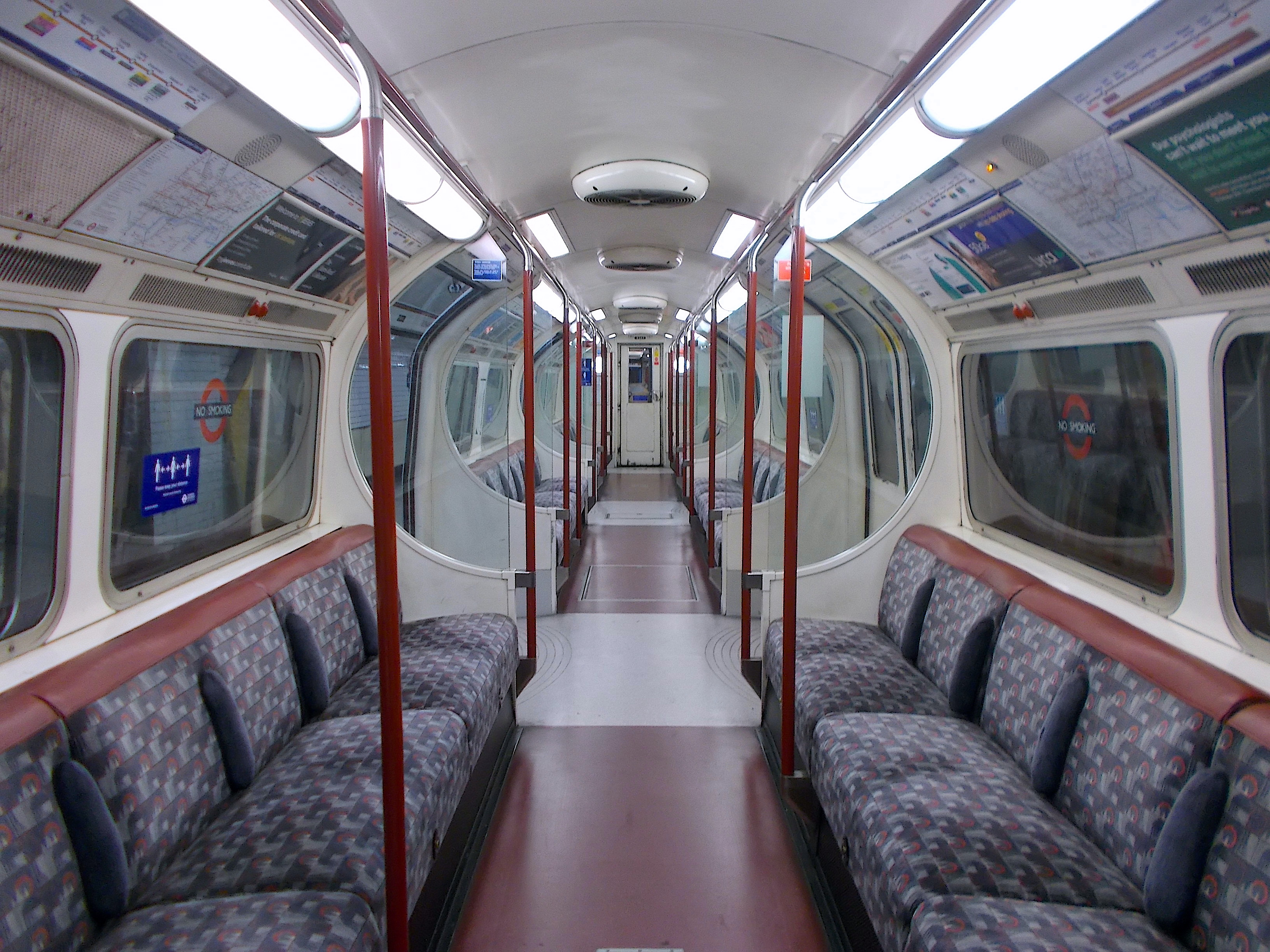
- The interior of a refurbished 1972 Stock trailer car
- Stock type: Deep-level tube
- In service: 26 June 1972 – present
- Manufacturer: Metro-Cammell
- Built at: Washwood Heath, England
- Replaced: 1938 Stock; 1959 Stock
- Constructed: 1972–1974
- Entered service: 26 June 1972
- Refurbished: Tickford (at Rosyth Dockyard) 1991–1995; Acton Works, 2016–2018
- Number built: 441 cars (63 trains)
- Number in service: 252 cars (36 trains)
- Successor: 1983 Stock (Jubilee Line); 1995 Stock (Northern Line)
- Formation: 7 cars per train
- Capacity: 851 per train
- Lines served: Current: Bakerloo line; Historically: Jubilee and Northern lines

Specifications
- Train length: 113.552 m (372 ft 6.6 in)
- Car length: DM 16.091 m (52 ft 9.5 in); T/UNDM 15.977 m (52 ft 5.0 in)
- Width: 2.641 m (8 ft 8.0 in)
- Height: 2.875 m (9 ft 5.2 in)
- Maximum speed: 72 km/h (45 mph)
- Traction system: Pneumatic single camshaft (Associated Electrical Industries)
- Traction motors: LT115 DC motor (Brush Traction)
- Seating: 40 per DM/UNDM car; 36 per T car; 264 per train

The London Underground 1972 Stock is a type of rolling stock used on the London Underground. The 1972 Stock originally operated on the Northern line until 1999 to make up the shortfall in trains on the 1959 Tube Stock fleet, and then they were transferred to the Bakerloo line following their displacement by the 1995 Stock. Following the withdrawal of the 1938 Stock-based British Rail Class 483 electric multiple units from the Isle of Wight in 2021, the 1972 Stock are now the oldest trains in regular passenger service in the United Kingdom. 63 seven-car trains were built in two separate batches.

== Construction ==
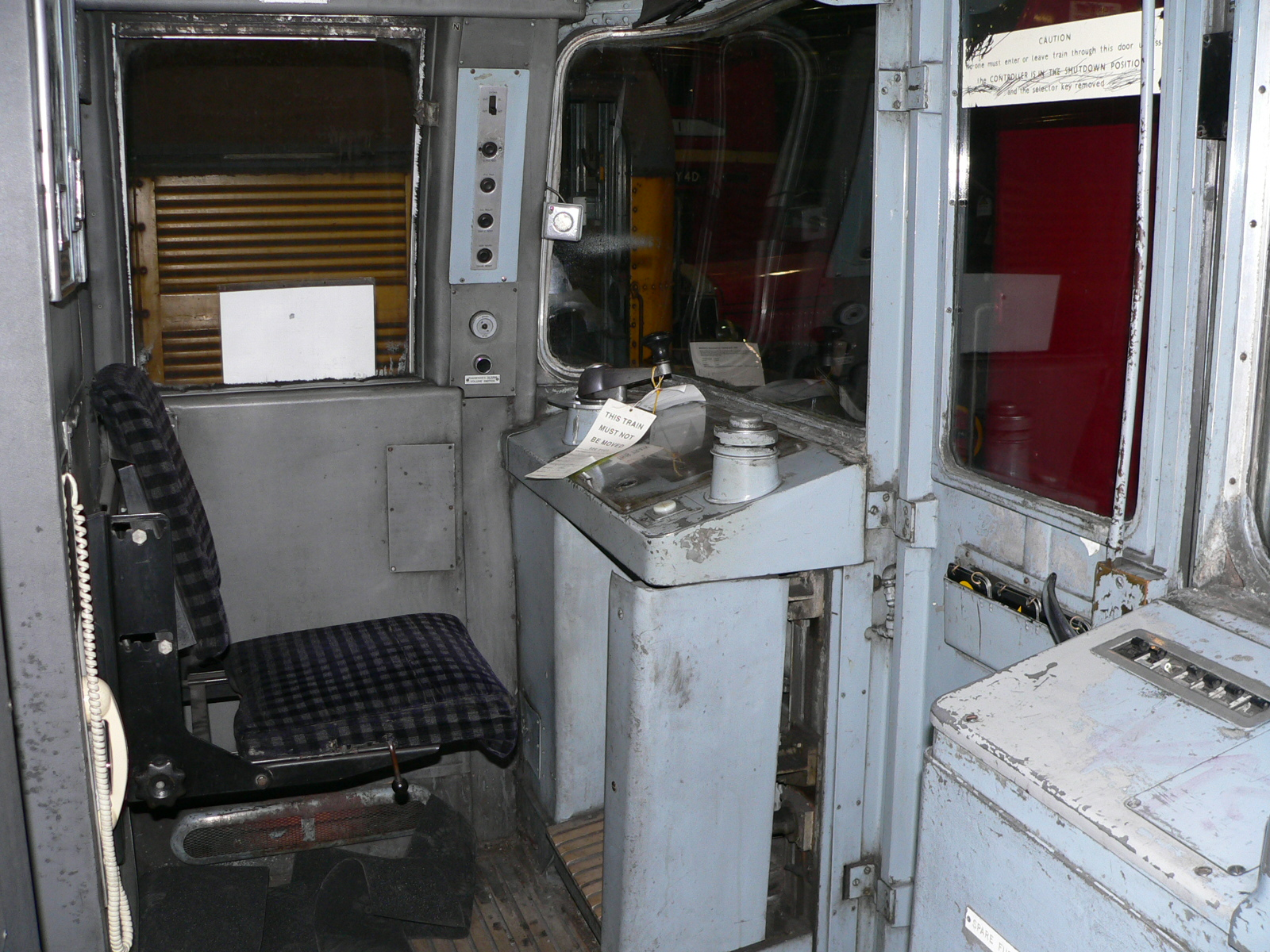
1972 Mark 1 stock cab

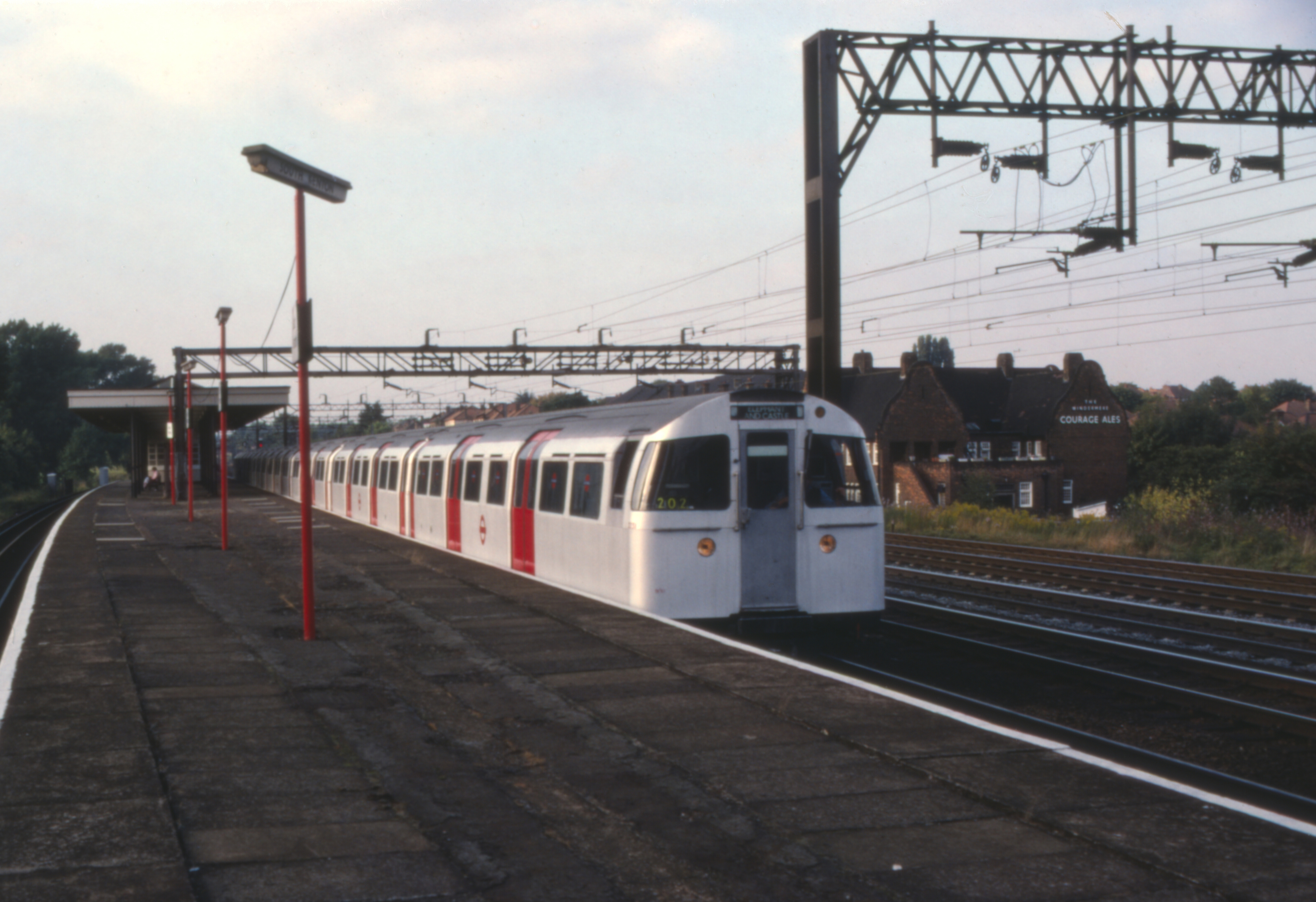
1972 Mark II stock in its original form at South Kenton

441 cars were built by Metro-Cammell at Washwood Heath, in two batches: the 1972 Mark I Stock comprised 90 driving motors (DM), 90 trailers (T) and 30 uncoupling non-driving motors (UNDM), to form 30 seven-car trains; the 1972 Mark II Stock was 33 seven-car trains (99 DM, 99 T and 33 UNDM).

In the early 1970s, the 1938 Tube stock on the Bakerloo and Northern line was life-expired and due for replacement. Tentative designs for a new Northern line fleet were abandoned when the go-ahead was given for the Piccadilly line to be extended to Heathrow Airport. That required a totally new fleet of trains to replace the 1959 stock then in use. The plan was made to transfer the 1959 trains to the Northern, to allow the worst of the 1938 stock there to be scrapped, but there were only 76 1959 stock trains, and the Northern line needed more than that to operate. Originally, it was planned to refurbish around 30 of the 1938 trains, but this was scrapped in favour of 30 new trains of the 1972 Mark 1 Tube stock.

There was a lack of time to design the 1972 stock, so the trains were based on the 1967 Tube stock on the Victoria line. Although almost identical looking, the 1972 trains were conventionally operated with a guard and door controls in the rear car, which were not compatible with 1967 Tube stock. In later years, some surplus 1972 Mark 1 cars started operating with the 1967 trains on the Victoria line, sandwiched in the middle due to the lack of ATO equipment.

A further 33 trains of 1972 Tube stock were ordered to provide service on the Northern line. The 1972 Mark 2 stock had slightly different interiors with a dark blue seating moquette, unlike the red and grey on the earlier 1967 and 1972 cars. The biggest external difference was that the doors were painted red, with a London Transport roundel on the side of the carriages, rather than the Johnston lettering.

The 1972 Mark 2 trains first operated on the Northern line alongside the 1972 Mark 1 trains. From the late 1970s, they were gradually transferred to the Bakerloo line and operated alongside the 1938 Stock until they began operating on the Jubilee line when it opened in 1979. With the introduction of the first batch of 1983 stock on the Jubilee line in 1984, half of the 1972 Mark 2 trains were displaced back to the Northern line. After the introduction of a second batch of 1983 Stock on the Jubilee in 1987, all 1972 Mark 2 trains on the Jubilee and Northern lines were gradually converted to OPO and transferred to the Bakerloo line to displace the 1959 stock, where they remain in service.

In 1989, several Northern line Mark 1 units were painted in experimental liveries, and three trains were internally refurbished, before the refurbishment work was stopped because of the decision to order a new fleet. 3227 and 3518 were painted with blue doors and a white body, 3204 and 3522 were painted with a blue and white body, and 3202 and 3523 were painted in what would become a corporate livery. The earlier 1972 Mark 1 stock on the Northern line was replaced by 1995 Stock in 1999. After being withdrawn from the Northern line, a few cars of 1972 Mark 1 stock were converted to run with 1967 and 1972 Mark 2 stock in service on the Victoria and Bakerloo lines.

A further two trains were converted to be compatible with the Mark II type, and these now run on the Bakerloo line. One ex-Northern line set (3229) was based at the now-closed Aldwych station, for use in films until being sent to Ealing Common Depot in November 2021 and then Ruislip depot a month later. Another Mark 1 unit in a trial livery was sent to Acton Works to be used for shunting. One three-car unit (unit 3511) used to reside at Hainault depot until October 2018, where cars 4511 and 3411 had moved to Acton Works. The cab of unit 3511 had been fused onto unit 3538 following collision damage.

The 1972 trains are formed of seven-car sets and have a total of 268 passenger seats. After withdrawal from the Northern Line, five four-car units (units 3201, 3208, 3211, 3212 and 3230) were considered for use on the Waterloo and City line. The objective was to supply the Central line with extra 1992 stock. This never happened and the trains were sent to Mayer Perry or CF Booth of Rotherham to be scrapped.

=== Refurbishment ===
The fleet was refurbished between 1991 and 1995 by Tickford at Rosyth Dockyard. From 2016 to 2018, the fleet was again refurbished at Acton Works to enable the trains to remain in service until their forecast replacement date of 2035. The class received the Class 499/2 designation on British Rail's TOPS system to operate on the Bakerloo line north of Queens Park.

In 2014 British textile design studio Wallace Sewell made a newly coloured version of the 2009 Barman Moquette for the 1972 stock currently on the Central, Northern and Jubilee lines. It features warm colours reflective of the Bakerloo line as opposed to the blue-based original Barman.

== Roster ==
		← Elephant & Castle (A) Harrow & Wealdstone (D) →						
Formation		32xx (DM)	42xx (T)	43xx (T)	33xx (DM)	34xx (UNDM)	45xx (T)	35xx (DM)
Numbers	Mark I	3264 : 3267	4264 : 4267	4364 : 4365	3364 : 3365	3464 : 3467	4564 : 4567	3564 : 3567
Numbers	Mark I	3264 : 3267	4264 : 4267	4367	3367	3464 : 3467	4564 : 4567	3564 : 3567
Numbers	Mark II	3231 : : : 3248	4231 : : : 4248	4331 : : : 4348	3331 : : : 3348	3431 : 3438	4531 : 4538	3531 : 3538
Numbers	Mark II	3231 : : : 3248	4231 : : : 4248	4331 : : : 4348	3331 : : : 3348	3440 : 3463	4540 : 4563	3540 : 3563
Numbers	Mark II	3250 : 3256	4250 : 4256	4350 : 4356	3350 : 3356	3440 : 3463	4540 : 4563	3540 : 3563
Numbers	Mark II	3258 : 3263	4258 : 4263	4358 : 4363	3358 : 3363	3440 : 3463	4540 : 4563	3540 : 3563
Numbers	Mark II			4366	3366			
Numbers	Mark II	3299	4299	4399	3399			

== Future replacement ==
In the late 1990s, the Labour government initiated a public–private partnership (PPP) to reverse years of underinvestment in London Underground. Under the PPP contract, Metronet (the private consortium responsible for the Bakerloo line) would order new rolling stock for the Bakerloo line. This would take place following the delivery of 2009 Stock and S Stock trains, with an order for 24 new Bakerloo line trains. These would have entered service by 2019. However, Metronet collapsed in 2007 after cost overruns, and the PPP ended in 2010.

In the mid 2010s, TfL began a process of ordering new rolling stock to replace trains on the Piccadilly, Central, Bakerloo and Waterloo & City lines. A feasibility study showed that new-generation trains and resignalling could increase capacity on the Bakerloo line by 25%, with 27 trains per hour.

In June 2018, the Siemens Mobility Inspiro design was selected. These trains will have an open-gangway design, wider doorways, air conditioning and the ability to run automatically with a new signalling system. TfL could only afford to order Piccadilly line trains at a cost of £1.5bn. However, the contract with Siemens includes an option for 40 trains for the Bakerloo line in the future. This would take place after the delivery of the Piccadilly line trains in the late 2020s. Based on a November 2021 paper, due to a lack of funding, this might not happen until the late 2030s or early 2040s, when the trains would be 60 to 70 years old — probably double their design life. Since the withdrawal of the Class 483 on the Isle of Wight, the 1972-stock trains have become the oldest non-heritage trains running in the United Kingdom.

== Post-withdrawal use ==
Subseries	Car number(s)	Notes
Mark I	3213-4213; 3313-4313	Converted into Asset Inspection Train: see below.
Mark I	3214-3314	Cab of 3214 was converted into a static tourist exhibit at the Hamleys toy store. Since late 2018, the cab was up for sale on eBay since being replaced by Harry Potter merchandise. Cab of 3314 in storage at The Cab Yard.
Mark I	3229-4229; 4329-3329	Formerly used for filming and training purposes. Stripped for spares at Ruislip depot in 2022, and awaiting scrapping in Staffordshire as of October 2023.
Mark I	3530	Preserved at the Acton Depot of the London Transport Museum in Acton, London Borough of Ealing

=== Asset Inspection Train ===
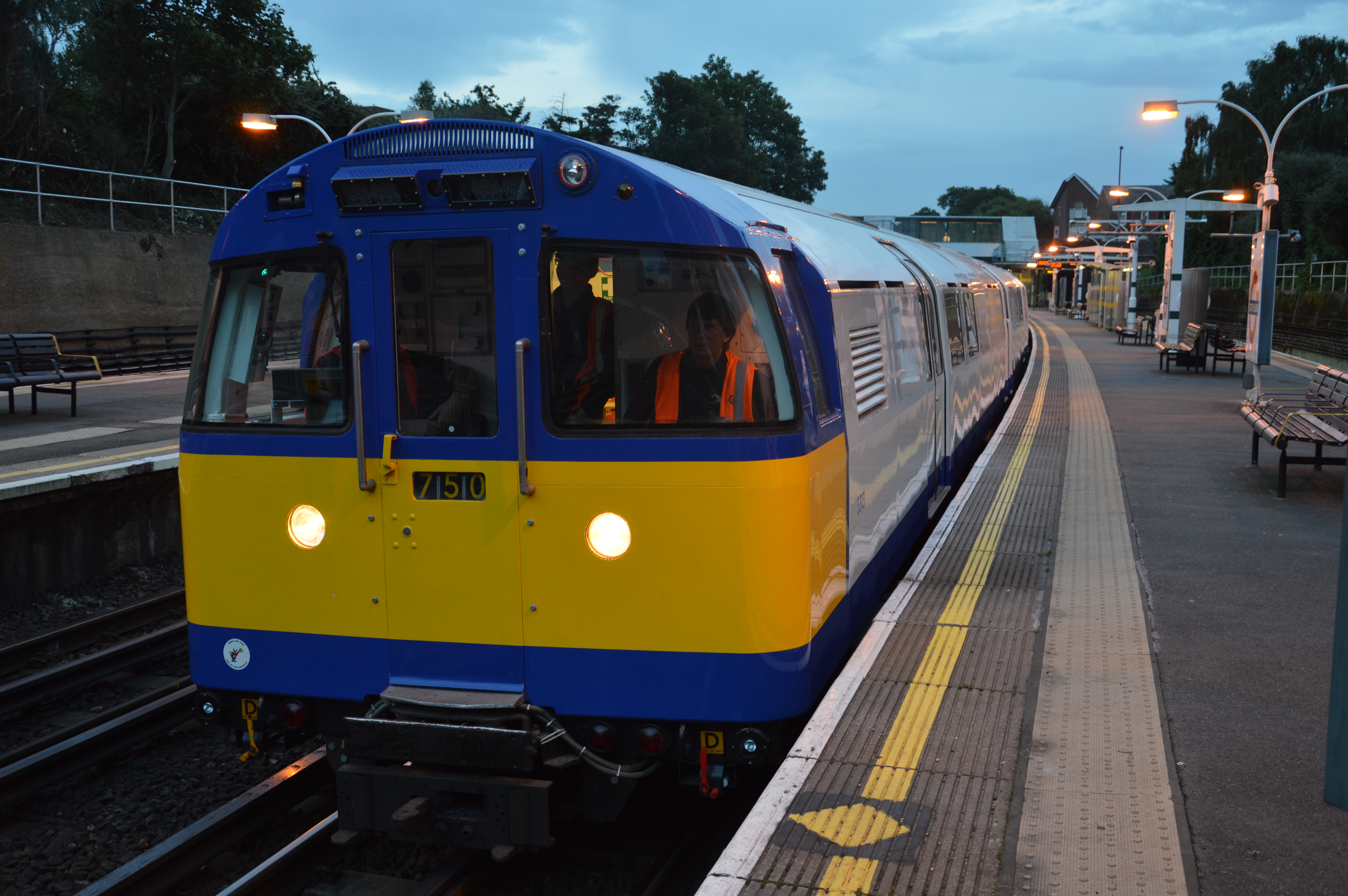
1972 MkI Tube Stock 3313 incorporated into the Asset Inspection Train (AIT)

Middle two cars are 67DM vehicles - 3079, 3179. Front 2 and rear two are 72 Mark 1 stock

- Front two (72 Mark 1) 3313-4313
- Rear two (72 Mark 1) 4213-3213

Units 3079 & 3179 were overhauled at Eastleigh Works following withdrawal with no cab windows and new cables leading into each other. The AIT (Asset Inspection Train) was to replace the Track Recording Train (1960 Stock DMs and 73 Stock T) which is currently in use. However, in July 2021 the AIT was scrapped at LKM Recycling Sittingbourne.

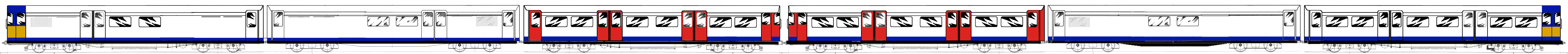
