= British Rail Class 499 (London Underground) =

Class for some London Underground trains

British Rail Class 499 is a TOPS designation allocated to London Underground electric multiple units that operate on Network Rail tracks for part of their journey. The designation was previously used by a class of luggage vans on British Rail's Southern Region, but was reused by Railtrack from 1994 for its current purpose. This does not involve any renumbering of the stock involved, and is only for electronic recording purposes.

The designations are:

TOPS Number	LU Type	LU Line	Section	Status	Image
499/0	D78	District	Gunnersbury to Richmond and East Putney to Wimbledon	Withdrawn	
499/1	C69/77	District	Gunnersbury to Richmond and East Putney to Wimbledon	Withdrawn	
499/2	1972	Bakerloo	Queen's Park to Harrow & Wealdstone	In service	
499/3	1996	Jubilee	None	In service	
499/4	1995	Northern	None	In service	
499/5	S7	District	Gunnersbury to Richmond and East Putney to Wimbledon	In service	
499/5	S8	Metropolitan	None (Chiltern Railways trains use LUL track between Harrow-on-the-Hill and Amersham)	In service	
