= London Underground 1983 Stock =

Train used on the Jubilee line from 1984–1998

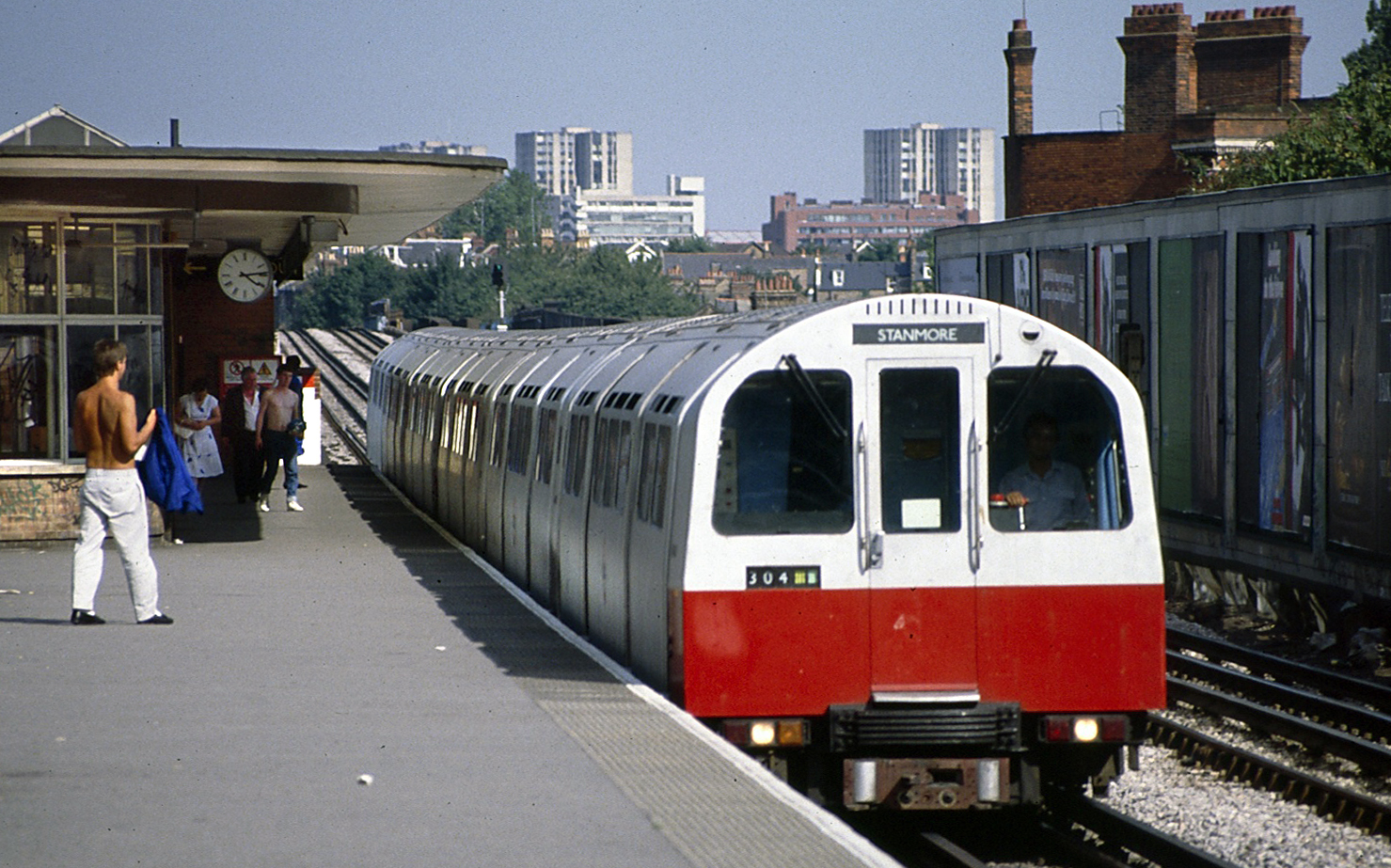
- 1983 Stock at Kilburn in 1988

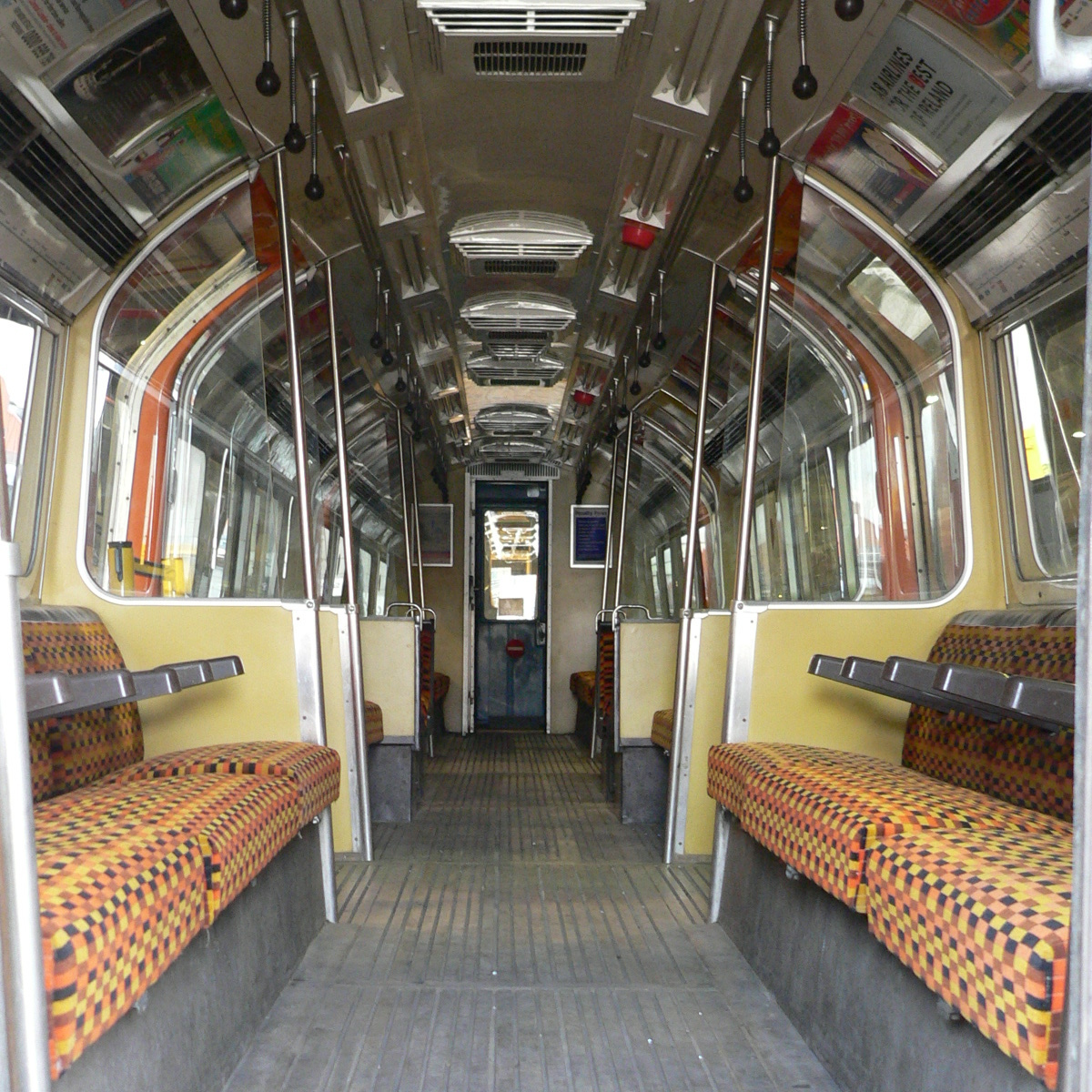
- Interior at London Transport Museum Depot in 2005
- Stock type: Deep-level tube
- In service: 8 May 1984 – 9 July 1998 (14 years)
- Manufacturer: Metro-Cammell
- Designer: London Underground Acton Works
- Built at: Washwood Heath, England
- Replaced: 1972 Stock
- Constructed: 1982–1983; 1987–1988 (Batch Two)
- Scrapped: 1998
- Number built: 31 1/2 sets, (63 3-car units, 189 cars)
- Successor: 1996 Stock
- Formation: 3 cars per unit, 2 units per train
- Capacity: 1262 (288 seats, 974 standing)
- Line served: Jubilee

Specifications
- Car body construction: steel underframe and aluminium body
- Train length: 107.7 m (353 ft 4.2 in)
- Car length: 17.73 m (58 ft 2.0 in)
- Width: 2.63 m (8 ft 7.5 in)
- Height: 2.87 m (9 ft 5.0 in)
- Maximum speed: 100 kilometres per hour (62 mph)
- Weight: 38.1 tonnes (84,000 lb) (driving motor); 33.4 tonnes (74,000 lb) (trailer)
- Traction motors: LT122 DC motor (Brush Traction)
- Electric systems: Fourth rail, 630 V DC
- Current collection: Contact shoe

The London Underground 1983 Stock was a class of electric multiple unit built by Metro-Cammell for use on London Underground's Jubilee line.

The 1983 Stock was the last train to be designed in-house by London Underground; it was the last conventional Tube train in the long line of evolving design since the 1938 Stock. The stock was built by Metro-Cammell to replace the 1972 Mark II Stock operating on the Jubilee line; in turn this was intended to enable those trains to replace the 1938 Stock on the Bakerloo line. The trains were considered to be unpopular by passengers, and were relatively unreliable in service. They were withdrawn after just 14 years in service, and were replaced by the 1996 Stock.

== History ==
As part of the development of the Fleet line in the 1970s, London Underground Acton Works began work on designing new rolling stock for the line. The design was finalised in 1978. 60 6-car trains would be required for the full Fleet line, and around 30 trains required for the first phase to Charing Cross. However, declining ridership and cancellation of future phases of the now-Jubilee line meant that only 15 6-car trains were ordered from Metro-Cammell in 1982.

The first train was delivered in August 1983, and first entered service in May 1984. All 15 trains had been delivered by May 1985. Some trains were returned to Metro-Cammell for modification after delivery, as they were 18 millimetres (0.71 in) too wide. This embarrassment was picked up in the international press, as Metro-Cammell competed to win the rolling stock contract for the Singapore MRT. An increase in passenger numbers in the mid 1980s meant that another 16^{1}/_{2} sets were ordered in August 1986 (called Batch Two), entering service from November 1987. All trains were converted to one person operation from 1986 onwards.

The 1983 stock owed much to the sub-surface D Stock in design. Like the D Stock, the 1983 Stock had single leaf doors, a similar orange interior and cab design. The single leaf doors allowed for a greater number of seats per car, and would end up being the last deep-level tube trains with transverse seats to enter service (excluding the blue cars from the experimental 1986 Stock). It also featured headlights that were positioned underneath the train body, and "bobbles on springs" strap-hangers for standing passengers within, the last new trains to have them. All trains were formed of six carriages, made up of two three-car units, coupled together, with each unit consisting of two Driving Motor cars (DM) and a Trailer car (T). The six-car trains were therefore formed DM-T-DM+DM-T-DM.

The 1983 Stock proved to be unreliable. Electrical generators for lighting the carriages often failed, as did the motors. Boarding of passengers was slow because of the single leaf doors. Generally, the trains were considered to be unpopular by passengers, and staff considered them unreliable. Subsequent design and engineering of rolling stock on the Underground was done by external contractors, with London Underground writing a train specification instead of designing the train itself.

=== Replacement ===
With the Jubilee Line Extension in mind, it was originally planned that the 1983 Stock would be heavily refurbished to run alongside the newer 1996 Stock that entered service on the Jubilee line in 1997; the plans included replacing the single leaf doors with double doors to speed up passenger boarding. The 1983 Stock was to be given similar interiors. This was abandoned due to the cost being only 10% cheaper than re-equipping the line entirely with the 1996 Stock. Then it was proposed for the 1983 Stock to be added to the refurbished 1973 Stock on the Piccadilly line and serve the Rayners Lane - Uxbridge section of the line. This was also abandoned on the grounds of cost. The last 1983 Stock train ran on the Jubilee line on 9 July 1998, having been in service for just 14 years.

Despite their newness and attempts to sell the trains abroad, the trains never returned to service. A number were stored at various locations around the network, and others were scrapped. Since retirement from service, nine cars had been stabled at sidings south of South Harrow station. Over the years these had been heavily vandalised. With the introduction of Night Tube services, additional stabling was required, so all nine cars were removed over the weekend of 27/28 June 2015, and taken to CF Booth, Rotherham for scrapping. Some trains were used for testing by the Health and Safety Executive at the Harpur Hill Health and Safety Laboratory.

=== Preservation ===
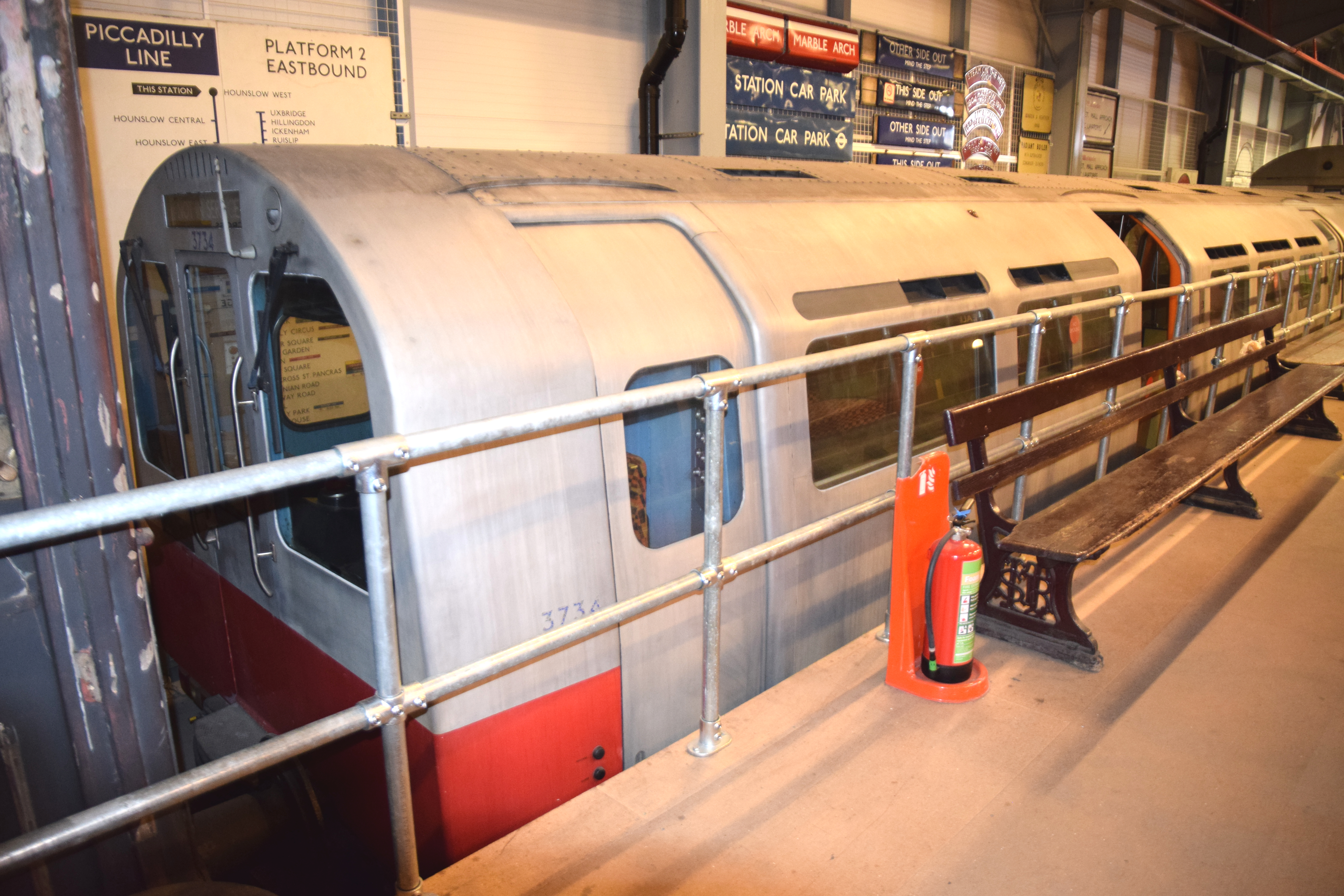
1983 Stock DM 3734 on display at the London Transport Museum Depot in Acton

One carriage of the stock has been preserved by the London Transport Museum and another had been used as a studio by Radio Lollipop at Great Ormond Street Hospital, but this was recently scrapped. A few more have been placed on the disused Broad Street viaduct in Shoreditch for use as artists' studios. List of preserved stock:

- DM 3734 at the London Transport Museum Depot.
- DM 3733 at Broad Street viaduct.
- T 4633 at Broad Street viaduct.
- T 4662 at Broad Street viaduct.
- DM 3662 at Broad Street viaduct.
- DM 3721 at Washington, Sunderland used as tunnel rescue training.
- The complete destination blind from DM 3702 exists in a private collection, and is in operational condition.
