= London Underground S Stock =

British electric rolling stock

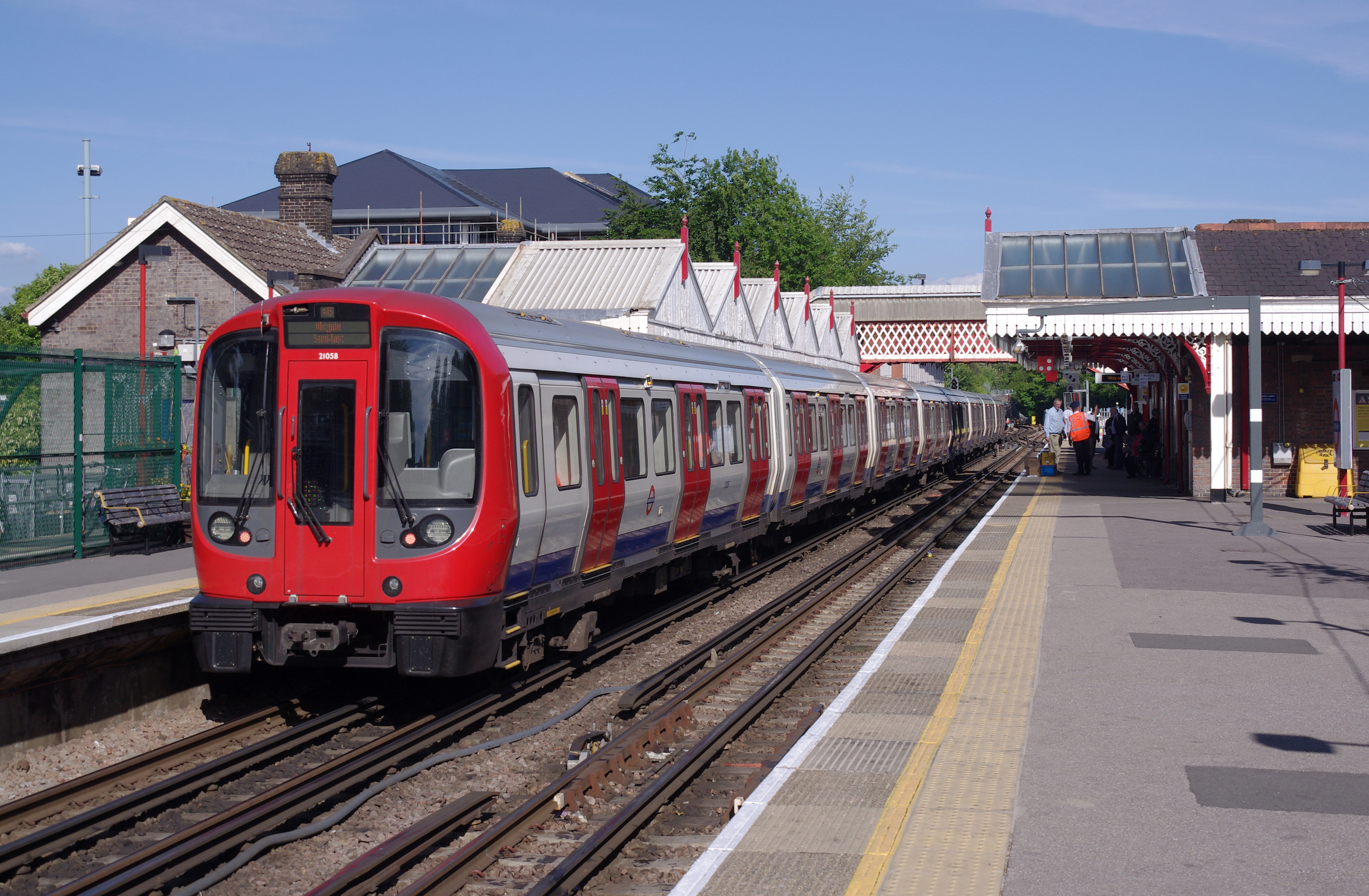
- A Metropolitan line S8 Stock train at Amersham in 2013

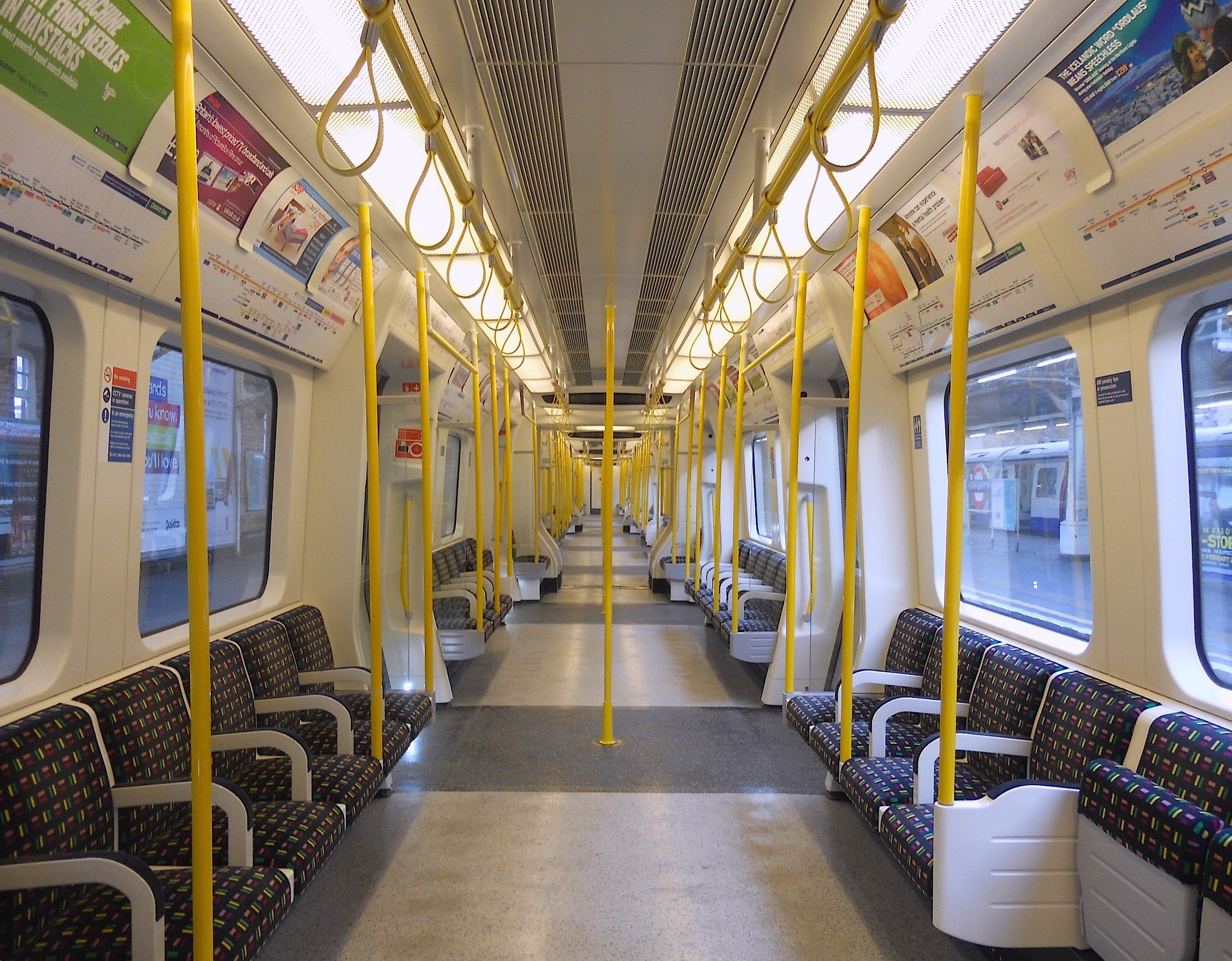
- The interior of a Circle line S7 Stock train
- In service: S8: 31 July 2010 − present; S7: 6 July 2012 − present
- Manufacturer: Bombardier Transportation
- Built at: Derby Litchurch Lane Works, Derby, England
- Family name: Movia
- Replaced: A60/62 Stock; C69/77 Stock; D78 Stock
- Constructed: 2008–2017
- Number built: 192 trains (S7: 133; S8: 59)
- Formation: S7: 7 cars per train; S8: 8 cars per train
- Fleet numbers: S7: 301/302–567/568; S8: 001/002–115/116
- Capacity: S7: 1,209; S8: 1,350
- Operator: London Underground
- Depots: Ealing Common; Neasden; Upminster; Hammersmith (stabling only); Lillie Bridge (stabling only)
- Lines served: S7: Circle; District; Hammersmith & City; S8: Metropolitan

Specifications
- Car body construction: Aluminium
- Train length: S7: 117.448 m (385 ft 3.9 in); S8: 133.682 m (438 ft 7.1 in)
- Car length: 18.139 m (59 ft 6.1 in) (DM); 16.234 m (53 ft 3.1 in) (NDM)
- Width: 2.92 m (9 ft 7 in)
- Floor height: 1,005 mm (39.6 in)
- Entry: Level
- Doors: 6 per car (3 per side)
- Wheel diameter: 770–710 mm (30–28 in) (new–worn)
- Wheelbase: 2.08 m (6 ft 10 in)
- Maximum speed: 100 km/h (62 mph)
- Traction system: Bombardier MITRAC IGBT–VVVF
- Traction motors: 3-phase AC induction motor
- Acceleration: 1.3 m/s^{2} (2.9 mph/s)
- Deceleration: 1.15 m/s^{2} (2.6 mph/s) (service); 1.4 m/s^{2} (3.1 mph/s) (emergency)
- Electric system: 630–750 V DC fourth rail
- Current collection: Contact shoe
- Bogies: Bombardier FLEXX Metro 1200 SSL
- Safety systems: Communications-based train control; Tripcock
- Track gauge: 1,435 mm (4 ft 8 1/2 in) standard gauge

The London Underground S7 and S8 Stock, commonly referred to as S Stock, is a type of passenger train running on the London Underground's subsurface lines since 2010. Manufactured by Bombardier Transportation's Derby Litchurch Lane Works, the S Stock was ordered to replace the A60, A62, C69, C77 and D78 stock on the Circle, District, Hammersmith & City and Metropolitan lines, which all dated from the 1960s and 1970s.

The order was for a total of 192 trains (1,403 cars), and consisted of two types, S7 Stock for the Circle, District and Hammersmith & City lines, and S8 Stock for the Metropolitan line, with differences in the arrangement of seating and number of cars. Both types have air-conditioning and lower floors to ease accessibility for people with disabilities, and also have open gangways to allow passengers to move from one car to another whilst the train is moving. The order was said to be the biggest single rolling-stock order in Britain at a cost of £1.5 billion.

Passenger service began on the Metropolitan line in July 2010, the Hammersmith & City line in July 2012, and the Circle and District lines in September 2013. The S Stock completely replaced the A Stock on the Metropolitan line in September 2012, and the C Stock on the Circle and Hammersmith & City lines in February 2014, and on the Edgware Road branch of the District line in June 2014; it fully replaced the D Stock on the rest of the District line in April 2017.

== Overview ==
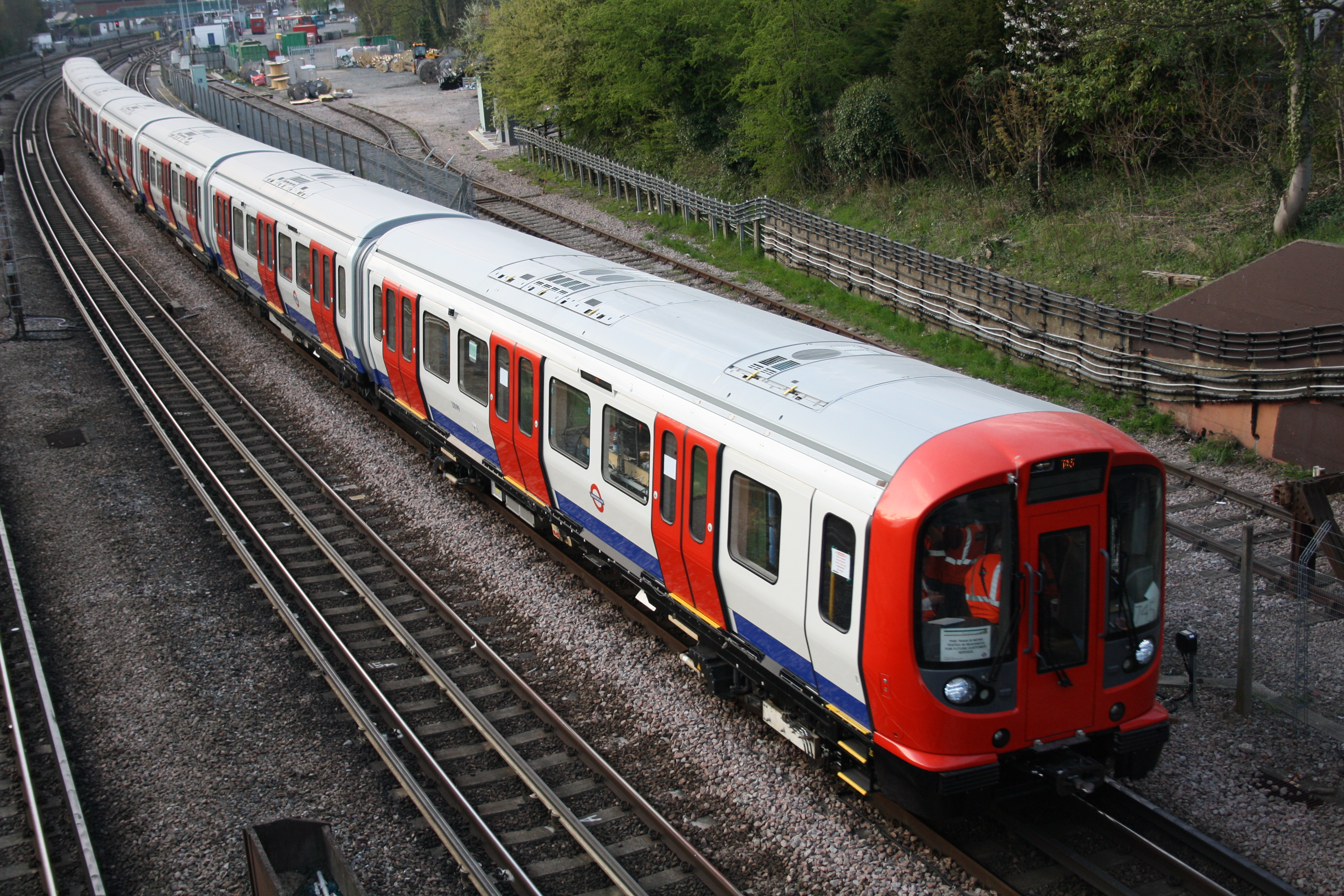
S8 Stock during testing near Northwood

The S designation stands for suburban, following the practice of designating sub-surface London Underground stock with a letter associated with its intended route—A Stock on the Metropolitan line to Amersham, C Stock on the Circle line, and D Stock on the District line.

Part of Bombardier's Movia family, the stock consists of 192 trains, with 133 S7 seven-car trains for the Circle, District and Hammersmith & City lines, and 59 S8 eight-car trains for the Metropolitan line. The order was said to be the biggest single rolling-stock order in Britain at a cost of £1.5 billion.

S Stock trains have faster acceleration than previous models, at 1.3 m/s^{2} (2.9 mph/s); their top speed of 100 km/h (62 mph) is 13 km/h (8 mph) slower than A Stock, but faster than C and D Stocks. During the period of dual operation with both old and new trains, the stock had its performance capped to match that of the older trains in order to comply with signalling constraints and avoid bunching of the service. S8 stock trains seat 306 passengers compared with 448 for A Stock, a reduction of 32%, but can accommodate 25% more standing passengers (1,226 compared with 976) and have dedicated space for wheelchairs.

As of 2017, the fleet is significantly more reliable than older trains, averaging around 110,000 km (68,000 mi) between failures – around seven times further than A Stock and C Stock trains, and three times further than D Stock.

The voltage has been increased from nominal 630 volts to 750 volts. This allows for better performance and also for the increased power demands of air-conditioned, fully motored-axle trains, and allow the trains to return energy to the network through regenerative braking.

From 2016, the fleet has been converted to use communications-based train control (CBTC) as part of the Four Lines Modernisation. Upon completion of the project, there will be more frequent service as well as faster journey times. As of 2023, trains are manually operated on most of the Metropolitan line and about half of the District line; the Circle and Hammersmith & City lines are fully automatic.

== Features ==
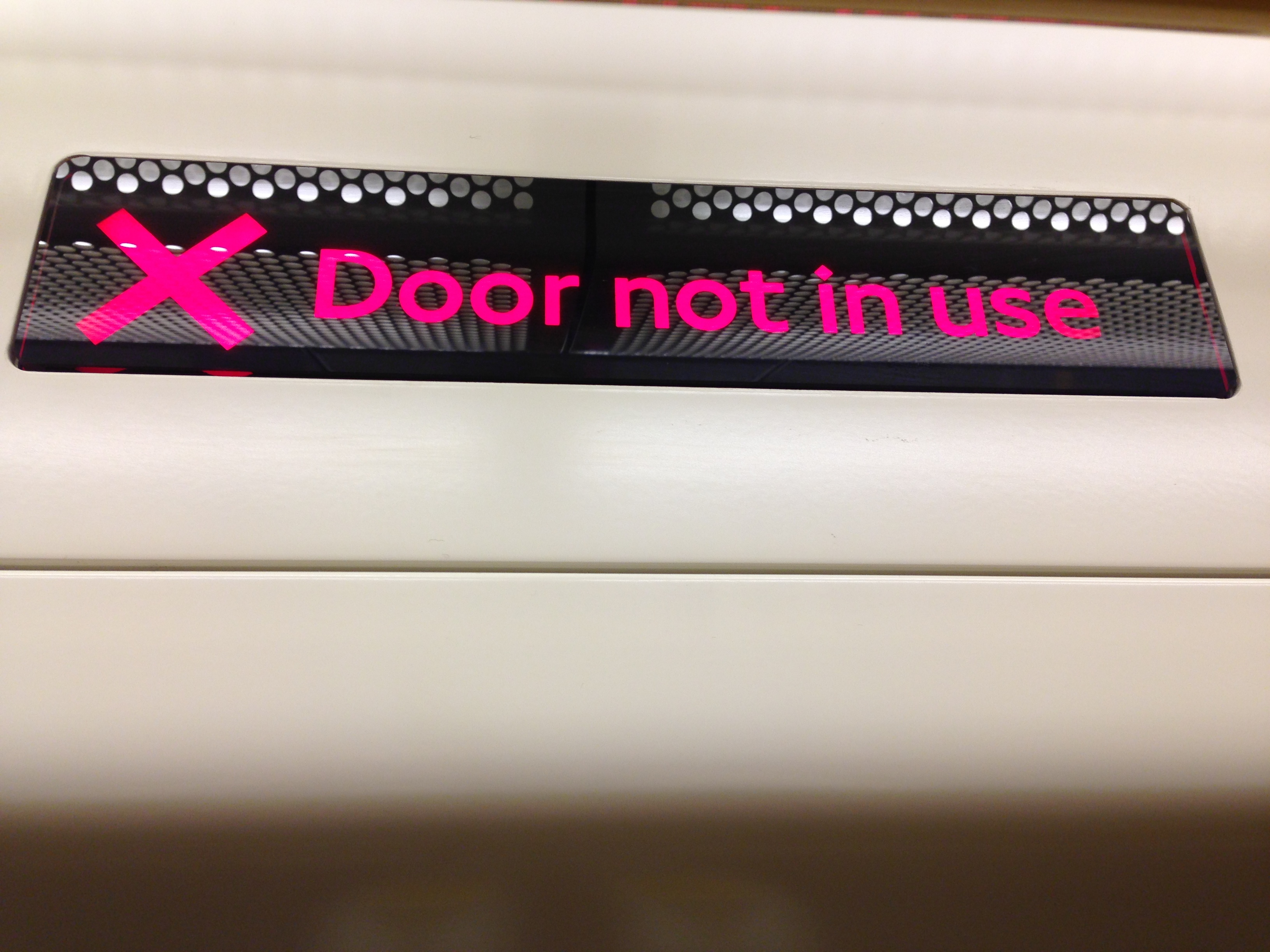
Selective door operation (SDO) is used at some stations where the platform is shorter than the train, such as at Baker Street.

The S Stock is air-conditioned throughout: the sub-surface tunnels (unlike deep-level tube lines) allow the exhausted hot air to disperse, and two-thirds of the sub-surface network is in the open air. The stock has regenerative brakes, returning around 20% of their energy to the network and thus increasing energy efficiency.

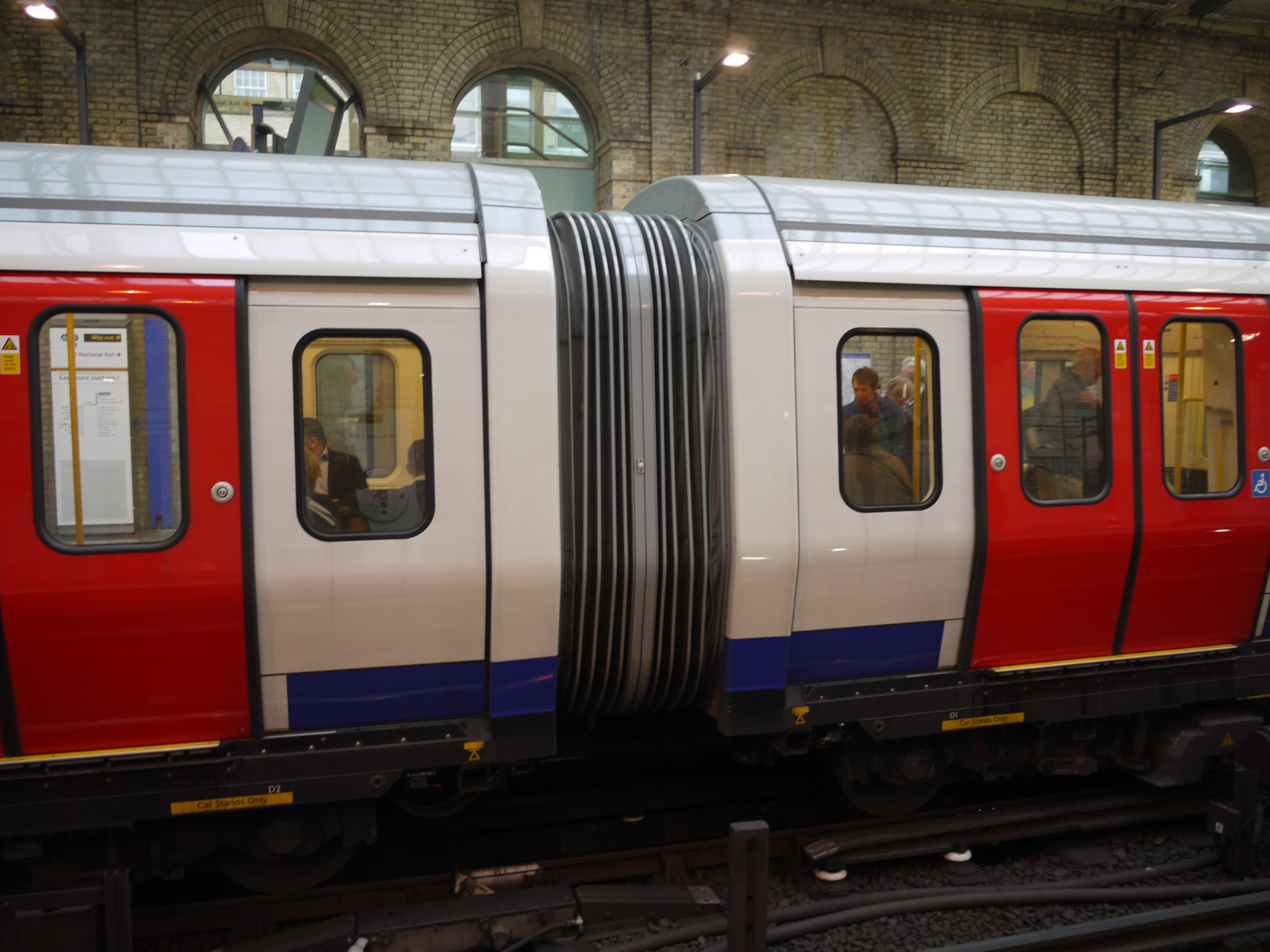
Gangway connection between cars

End external displays show two lines of text: the top line for the destination, and the bottom for the line. Internally, it has larger dot matrix indicators (DMIs) than D Stock (A and C Stock lacked DMIs). The DMIs show destination and line, and can display other messages such as safety notices. There are also DMIs on the exterior, with text alternating between destination and line, and on S8 Stock the stopping pattern (fast, semi-fast or all stations). The S8 Stock is the first on the Metropolitan line with dot-matrix indicators and automated voice announcements. Unlike the deep-tube stock, the DMIs are ceiling-hung rather than on the wall.

The air-conditioning system, the first on London Underground trains, is supplied by Mitsubishi and has two circuits so that if one fails there is still 50% capacity. Open gangways from car to car (similar to London Overground's Class 378) allow passengers to move from crowded cars to ones with more room, provide extra room for standing, and create a sense of security. CCTV enables the driver to see into every car, while track-to-train video links give the driver a view of the train exterior before leaving a station. There is a fold-out set of steps in each driver's cab to allow fast evacuation in an emergency.

The S stock has cantilevered seating for easy cleaning and accessible storage of bags. The seating configurations are different between the two models of trains: the S7 Stock, used on inner city lines with higher passenger traffic, has longitudinal seating throughout, while the S8 Stock, used for the longer journeys from the outer suburbs, has a mix of transverse and longitudinal seating, with four wheelchair spaces per train. S7 Stock trains are 117.45 m (385 ft 4 in) long, while the S8 trains measure 133.68 m (438 ft 7 in).

To prevent accidental pressing of emergency alarms, there are flaps over the alarm buttons next to wheelchair spaces.

Although S Stock trains can operate on all four sub-surface lines, S8 trains are used on the Metropolitan line and S7 trains are used on the other three lines. Selective door operation is used at certain stations that are shorter than the train. S7 Stock has seven cars per train, while S8 Stock has eight.

=== Design icon ===
As part of the Transported by Design programme of activities, on 15 October 2015, after two months of public voting, the walk-through S Stock train was elected by Londoners as one of the ten favourite transport design icons.

== History ==
Following the implementation of the London Underground Public Private Partnership (PPP) in 2003, the Metronet consortium became responsible for the infrastructure on the District, Circle, Hammersmith & City and Metropolitan lines. As part of the consortium, Bombardier Transportation would design, build and maintain new trains for these lines. 190 trains would be built by Bombardier at Derby Litchurch Lane Works – 40 trains for the Circle and Hammersmith & City lines, 78 trains for the District line, and 72 trains for the Metropolitan line. All the trains would be built to the same design, saving on parts and maintenance costs for Metronet. The only difference would be the length of the train, given different platform lengths on different lines. The first train was planned to enter service on the Metropolitan line by 2009, with all trains in service by 2015.

In December 2006, Metronet and London Underground unveiled the completed design, with air-conditioning and walk through carriages for the first time on the Underground. London Underground also announced that 40 additional cars had been ordered from Metronet/Bombardier at a cost of £105 million. This would allow for a seventh carriage on Circle and Hammersmith & City line trains, unifying the fleet with the District line trains.

In July 2007, Metronet, the private consortium responsible for the infrastructure for the sub-surfaces lines, collapsed due to financial difficulties. Following negotiations with Bombardier to allow for continued delivery of 2009 Stock and S Stock trains, TfL took ownership of Metronet in May 2008. A mockup of the train was shown off to the public in September 2008.

=== Entry into service ===
From March 2009, trains were tested prior to delivery at Old Dalby Test Track in Leicestershire, preventing the need for weekend or evening closures of lines in London to test trains. The first train was delivered to London Underground in October 2009. Built at Bombardier's Derby Litchurch Lane Works, trains were constructed at a rate of six a week at the height of production.

In 2015, TfL ordered an additional S8 train as part of the Croxley Rail Link at a cost of £15.5 million, taking the total ordered to 192. The final set was delivered 10 November 2016. The extension to the Metropolitan line was cancelled in 2017.

==== Metropolitan line ====
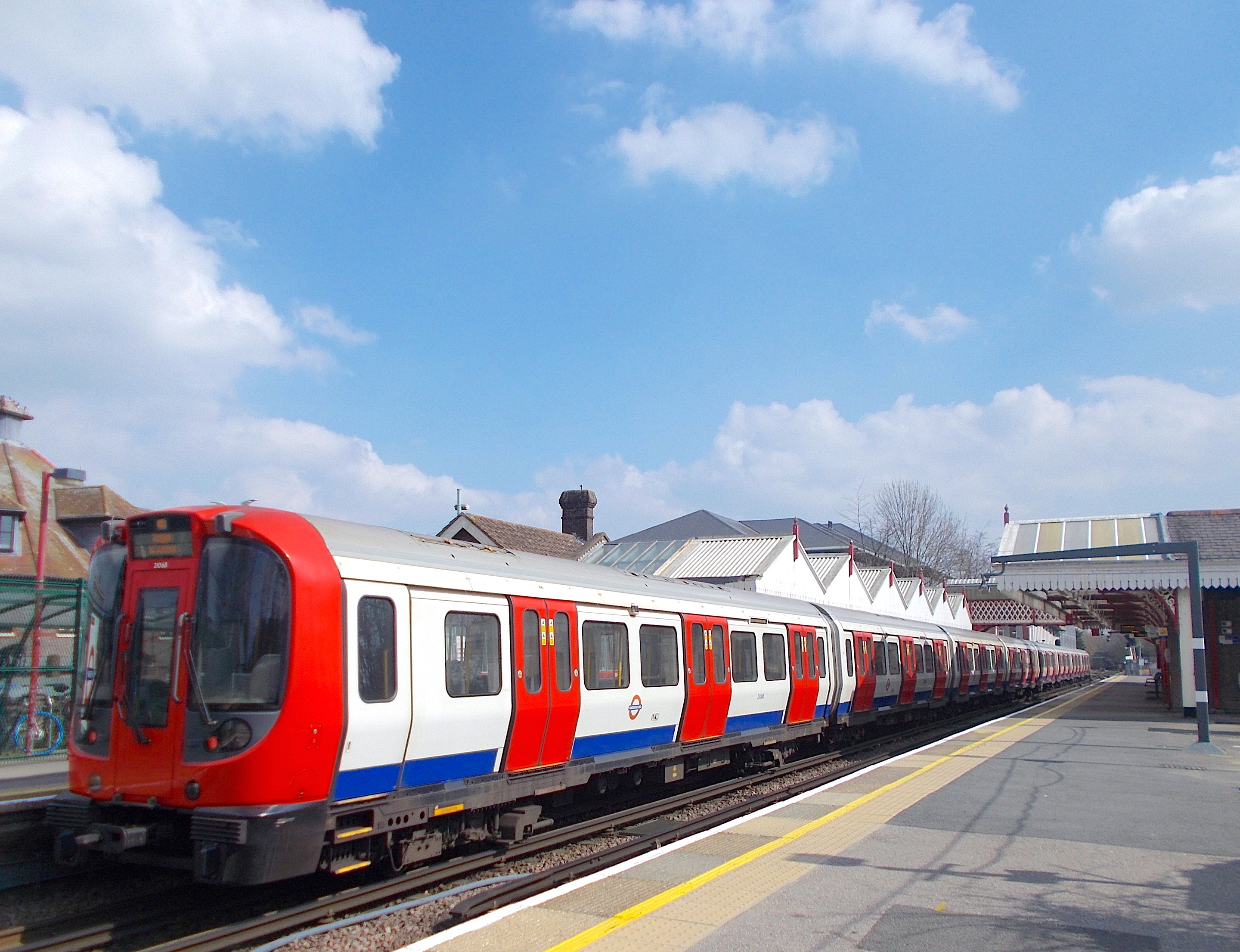
Metropolitan line S8 Stock train at Amersham

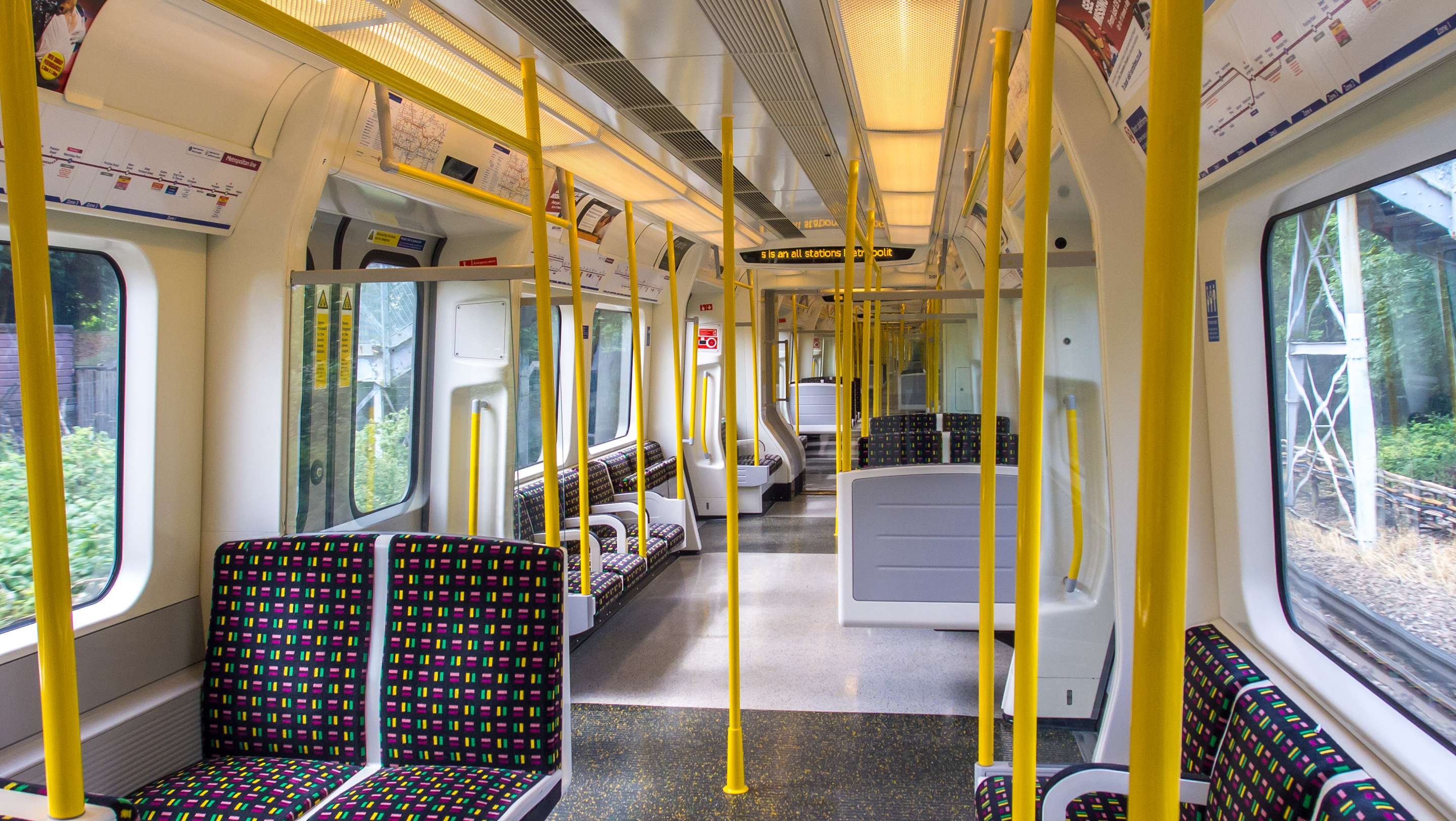
The interior of an S8 Stock train with a mix of transverse and longitudinal seats

S8 Stock was initially tested overnight between Amersham and Watford via the Watford North Curve from 9 November 2009. Driver training began in early January 2010, and the first train entered revenue service on 31 July 2010, shuttling between Wembley Park and Watford.

By 27 June 2011, S8 Stock was running along the whole Metropolitan line. Deliveries were suspended by Transport for London in November 2011 due to concerns over reliability. A number of trains were delivered to London Underground's Neasden Depot, but were not accepted to enter service. Deliveries resumed in mid-December 2011.

In August 2012, London Underground confirmed that strap handles would be introduced on S8 Stock, in response to passenger complaints over the height of the handrails as compared with A Stock.

By 15 September 2012, all 58 S8 trains had been delivered to Neasden Depot. The A Stock trains were completely withdrawn 11 days later. In November 2012, it was reported that 37 of the new trains would be sent back to Bombardier for urgent modification at Bombardier's cost, and that drivers were unhappy with their cabs. An additional S8 train was later delivered, as part of the subsequently cancelled Croxley Rail Link project.

There were also three additional eight-car trains called an S7+1 in use on the Metropolitan Line while the eight-car S8 trains were returned for engineering modifications and ATC fitment. These trains were formed of a seven-car S7 and an additional car from another S7, forming an eight-car train. These trains, however, retained the all-longitudinal seating of the S7, and thus could be distinguished from the remaining S8s. Two of these trains were modified back to seven-car trains and transferred for service on the Circle, District and Hammersmith & City Lines in 2018.

==== Hammersmith & City line ====
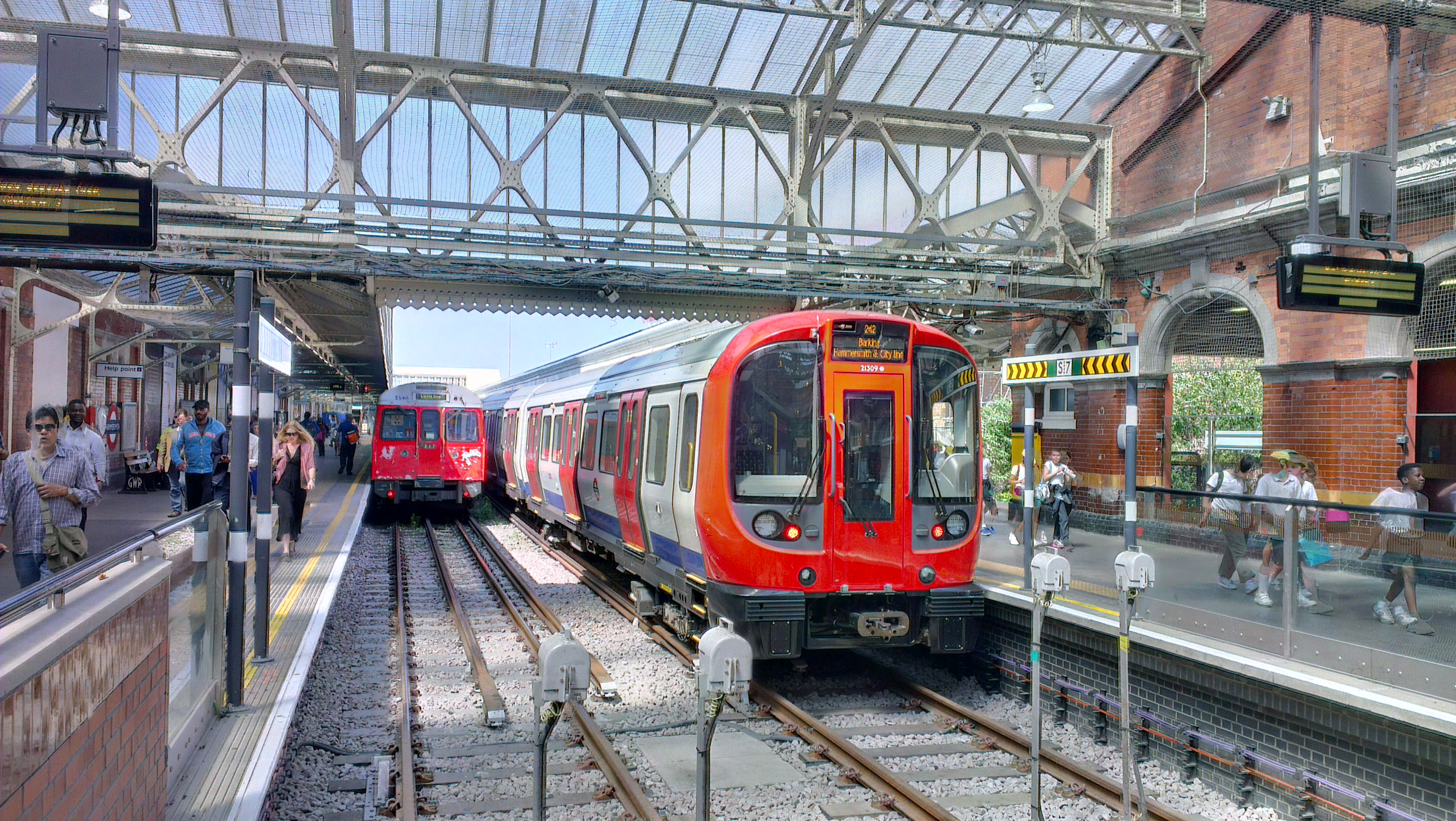
C Stock (left) and S7 Stock (right) at Hammersmith in 2013

The first trains entered service on 6 July 2012, from Hammersmith to Moorgate. S7 trains are longer than the C69 and C77 trains they replaced (seven cars and 117.45 m (385 ft 4 in) long instead of six cars and 93 m (305 ft 1 in) long), so some station platforms had to be lengthened to allow for S7 operations. For stations where this has proved physically impossible, such as Baker Street, the trains use their selective-door-opening capability whereby the doors at the end of the train will not open.

On 4 December 2012, an S7 train went east of Moorgate to Barking for testing. This was the first time an S7 train had been seen in peak hours. S7 Stock began operating a full service from Hammersmith to Barking on 9 December 2012. The line was completely operated with S7 stock from 11 February 2014.

==== Circle line ====
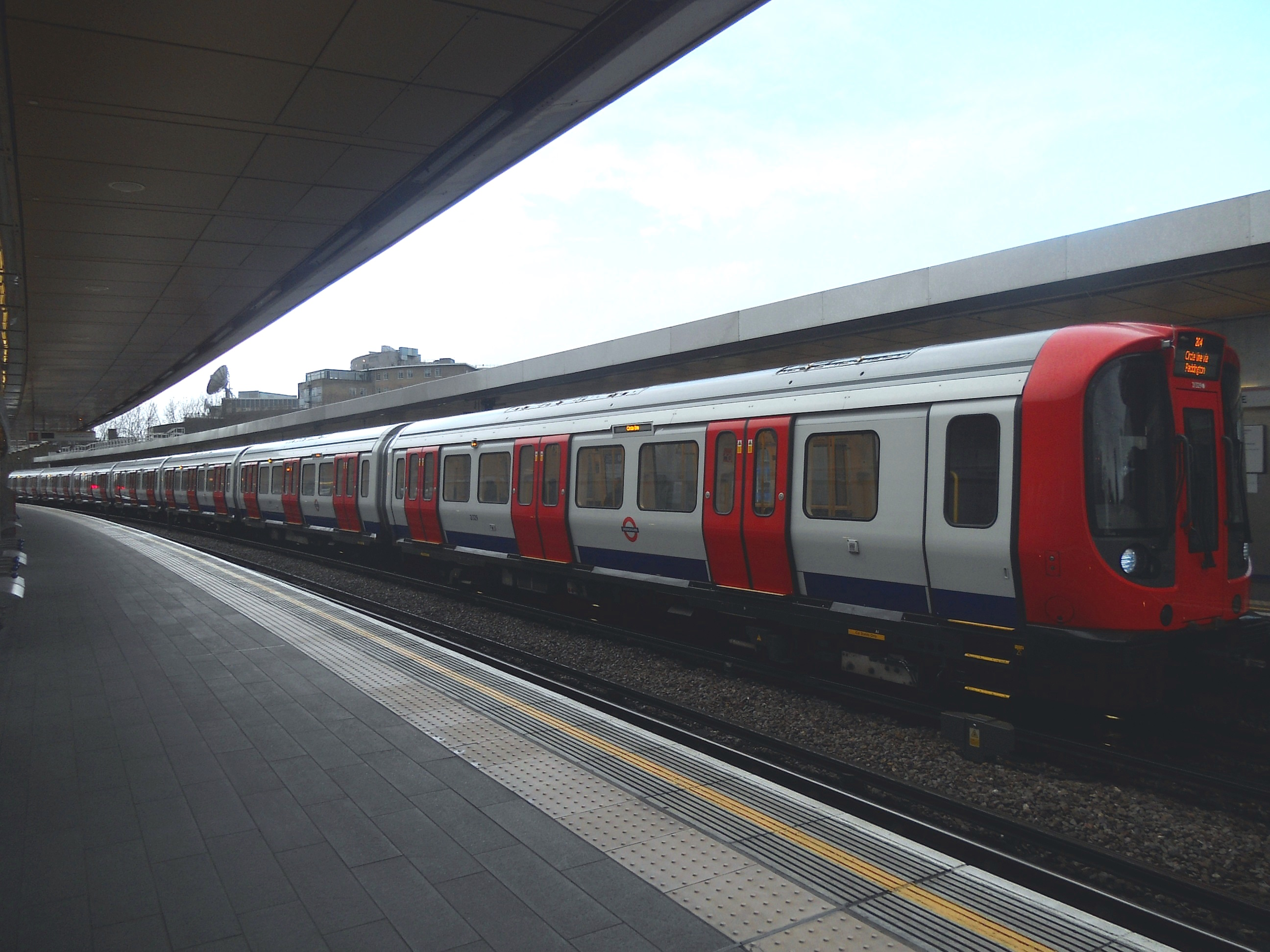
Circle line S7 Stock train at Wood Lane

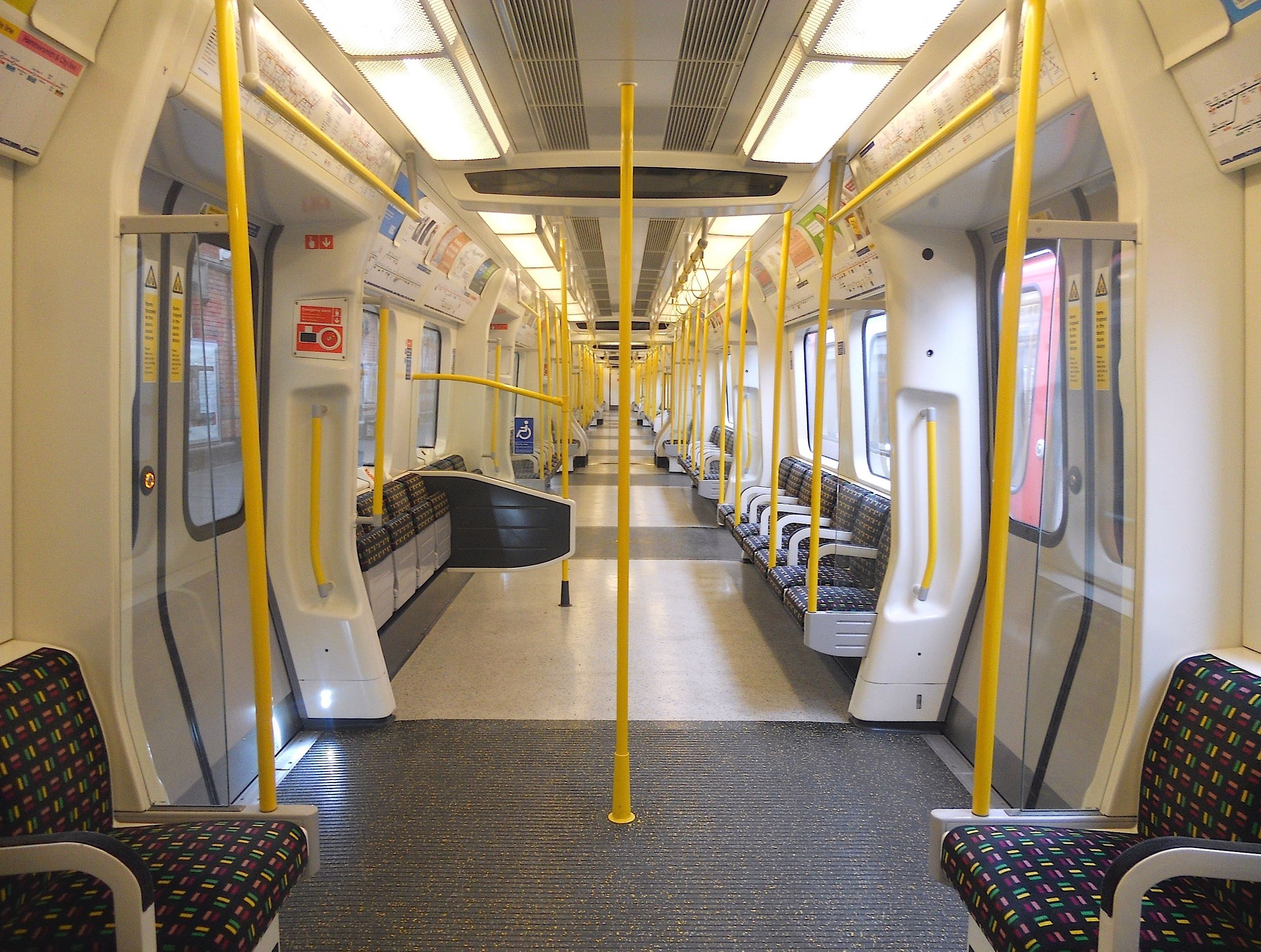
The interior of an S7 Stock train, showing the wheelchair parking places and longitudinal seating

The S7 Stock entered service on the Circle line on 2 September 2013, and completely replaced the C Stock trains on the line by 11 February 2014.

The Circle line's C Stock were replaced ahead of the District line's D Stock, as they were described by London Underground as being "in an increasingly poor state", and the D Stock had been extensively refurbished between 2005 and 2008.

==== District line ====
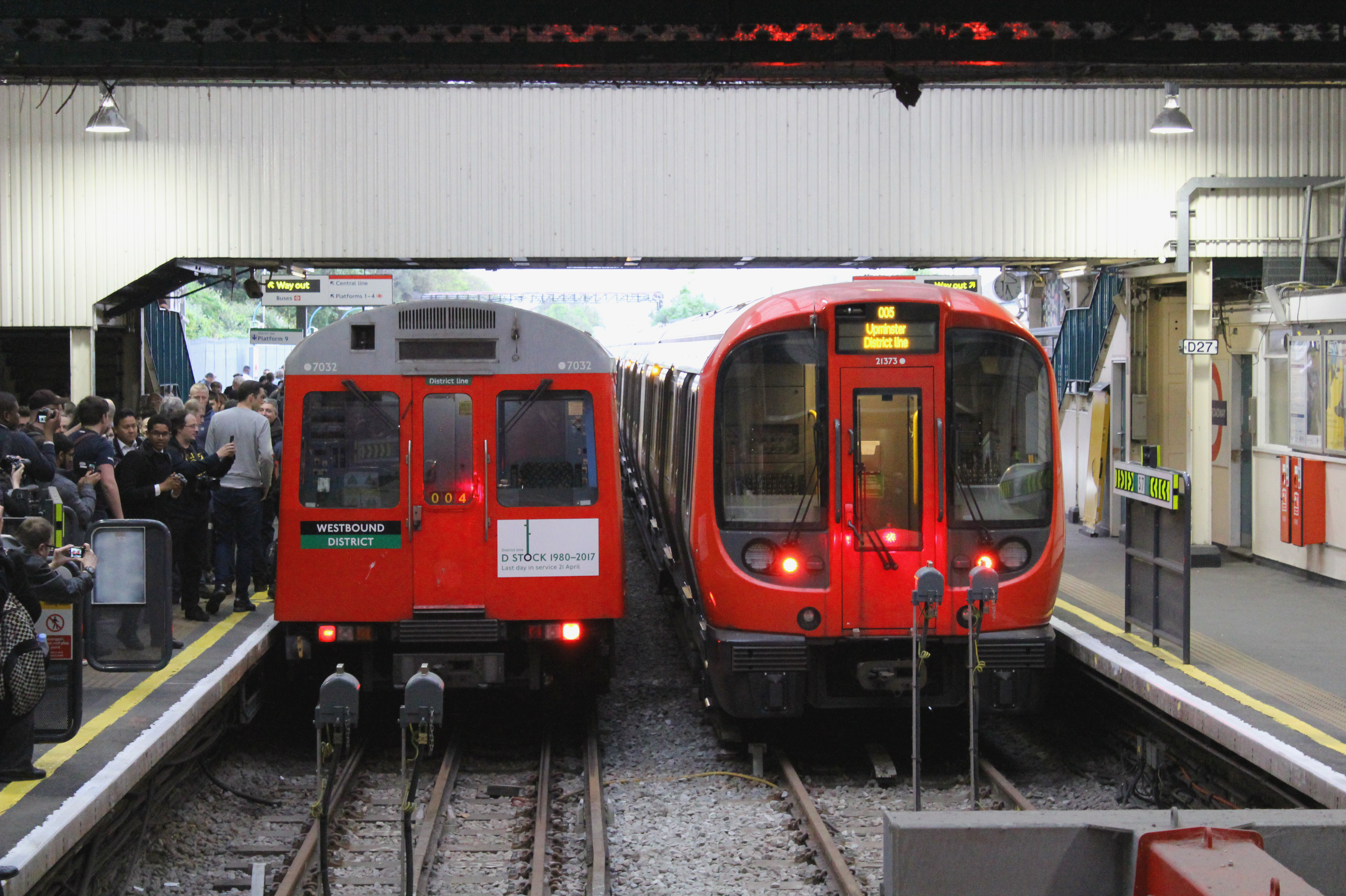
The last remaining D78 Stock train next to an S7 Stock train at Ealing Broadway station in 2017

The District line was the last line to be fully served by the S7 Stock, due to its existing D78 Stock being newer than other trains that the S7 Stock was ordered to replace, as well as its most recent refurbishment in 2005. The first S7 Stock train entered passenger service on the line between Olympia and West Ham on 2 September 2013.

On 6 February 2014, the S7 Stock started running between Wimbledon and Edgware Road. The S7 Stock started services to Ealing Broadway on 13 June 2014, and on 17 June saw the start of commercial service to Richmond. On 16 January 2015, the S7 Stock began running to Upminster. Withdrawal of the D78 Stock began on 19 January. In November 2016, the last of 192 S stock trains were completed by Bombardier and handed over to London Underground.

The D78 Stock was completely replaced by the S7 with the withdrawal of the final unit from service on 21 April 2017.

The S7 Stock received the Class 499/5 designation on the TOPS system in order to operate on the District line between Gunnersbury and Richmond, and between East Putney and Wimbledon, as these track sections are owned by Network Rail.

=== Automatic operation ===
From 2016, the Four Lines Modernisation project has been converting the four sub-surface lines to automatic train operation using communications-based train control. Upon completion of the project, there will be more frequent service as well as faster journey times. The section between Latimer Road and Hammersmith was the first to be switched over to automatic operation on 10 March 2019, with further extensions being implemented in stages called Signal Migration Areas (SMA); as of January 2023 the first six SMA areas have been implemented. Due to various reasons such as funding and technical difficulties, District line automation where it shares tracks with Network Rail or Piccadilly line services has been scaled back until further notice. As of 2023, trains are manually operated on most of the Metropolitan line and about half of the District line; the Circle and Hammersmith & City lines are fully automatic.

== Accidents and incidents ==
- On 21 June 2020, a Metropolitan S8 Stock was involved in a near miss incident at Chalfont & Latimer station. A Chiltern Railways train, formed of two British Rail Class 165 diesel multiple units, failed to stop at a danger signal and the trains were in danger of a head-on collision. The two trains stopped 23 metres (75 ft) apart.

== List of cars ==
Each car has a five-digit number: the second digit identifies the type of car, the last three digits the set number (001–116, 301–568). A-end cars have odd numbers; D-end even numbers. 25nnn cars replace 23nnn cars on trains equipped with de-icing equipment.

Set compositions
Set type	odd sets	A-end					D-end				even sets
Set type	odd sets	DM	M1	M2	MS		MS	M2	M1	DM	even sets
S7 de-icer	301–385	21nnn	22nnn		24nnn	—	24nnn	25nnn	22nnn	21nnn	302–386
S7	387–567	21nnn	22nnn		24nnn	—	24nnn	23nnn	22nnn	21nnn	388–568
S8 de-icer	001–055	21nnn	22nnn	23nnn	24nnn	—	24nnn	25nnn	22nnn	21nnn	002–056
S8	057–115	21nnn	22nnn	23nnn	24nnn	—	24nnn	23nnn	22nnn	21nnn	058–116

== See also ==
- 2009 Stock, a deep-level train built by Bombardier Transportation for the Victoria line
- Movia, a family of metro trains built by Bombardier Transportation
