= London Underground C69 and C77 Stock =

Type of sub-surface railway vehicle

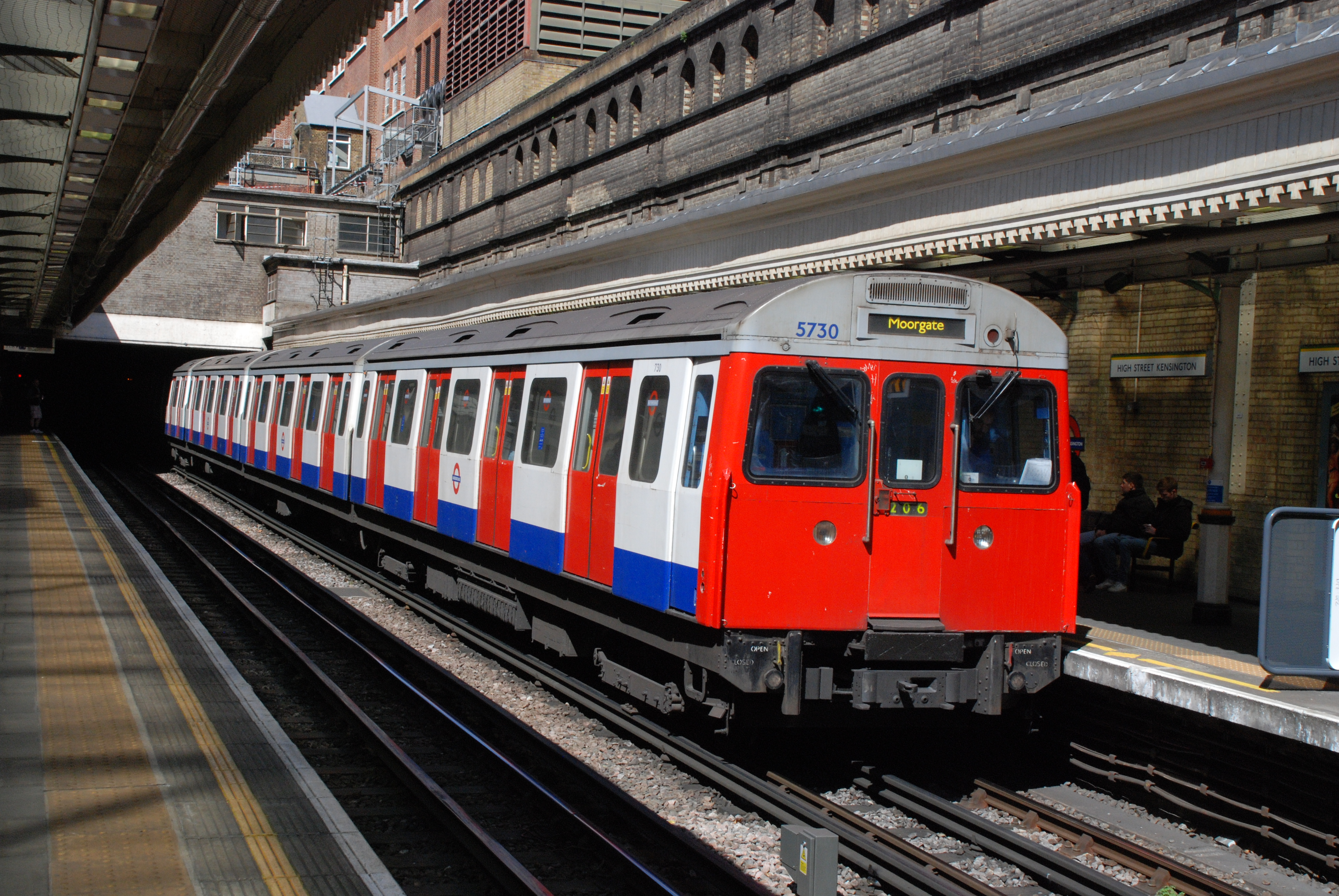
- Refurbished C Stock at High Street Kensington in 2013

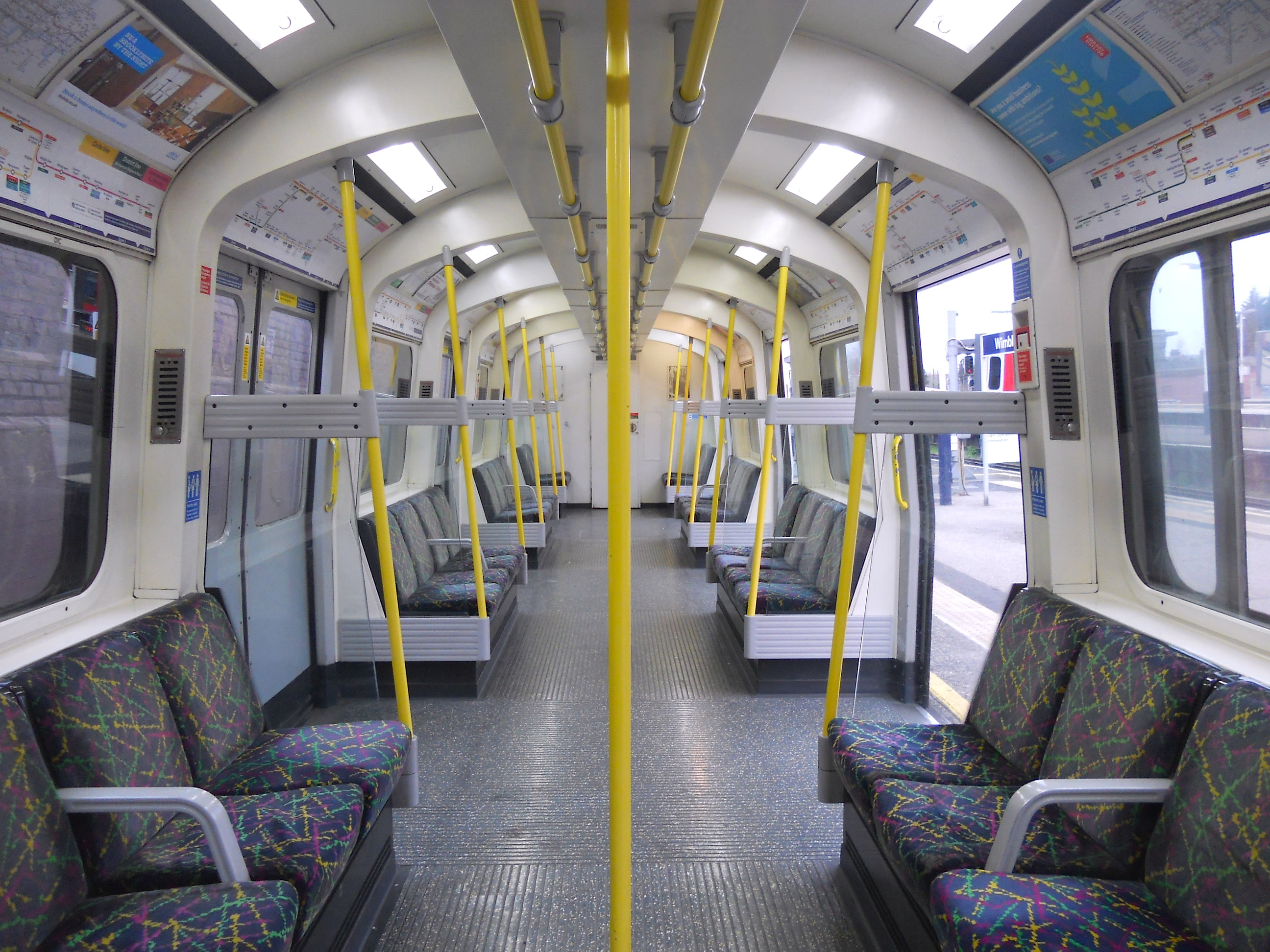
- The interior of a refurbished C Stock at Wimbledon
- Stock type: Sub-surface
- In service: 28 September 1970 – 3 June 2014
- Manufacturer: Metro-Cammell
- Built at: Washwood Heath, Birmingham, England
- Replaced: O and P Stock
- Constructed: 1969–1977
- Refurbished: RFS Industries, Doncaster 1991–1994
- Retired: 3 June 2014; 12 years ago
- Number preserved: 3 cars
- Successor: S7 Stock
- Formation: 2 cars per unit, 3 units per train
- Capacity: 821 per train
- Lines served: Circle (1970–2014); District (Wimbledon–Edgware Road) (1978–2014); Hammersmith & City (1990–2014); Metropolitan (1970–1990)

Specifications
- Car body construction: Aluminium
- Car length: DM 16.0 m (52 ft 6 in); T 14.94 m (49 ft 0 in)
- Width: 2.92 m (9 ft 7 in)
- Height: 3.68 m (12 ft 1 in)
- Weight: DM 31.70 t (31.20 long tons; 34.94 short tons); T 20.2 t (19.9 long tons; 22.3 short tons)
- Traction system: Pneumatic double camshaft (C69: English Electric-AEI Traction; C77: GEC Traction)
- Traction motors: LT117 DC motor (Brush Traction)
- Current collection: Contact shoe
- Seating: 198 per train

The London Underground C69 and C77 Stock, commonly referred to as the C Stock, was a type of sub-surface rolling stock used on the Circle, District and Hammersmith & City (formerly Metropolitan) lines of the London Underground between 1970 and 2014. They were replaced by the S7 Stock.

== History ==
In May 1968, an order for 212 cars (35 6-car trains, plus a spare car) was placed with Metro-Cammell of Washwood Heath to replace O Stock and P Stock on London Underground's Circle and Hammersmith & City lines for delivery from 1969, but trials of a four-car unit were delayed until summer 1970. The C69 stock first entered service on 28 September 1970. For the name of the train, the letter C was chosen as the train would be used on the Circle line.

The C69 stock was constructed using the then-standard form of a load-bearing aluminium underframe with a non-load-bearing body of riveted panels on aluminium framing. The high-density nature of the Circle line service meant that loading times were important; consequently all cars were fitted with four double sets of air-operated sliding doors per side. Seating was mainly transverse, and total seating capacity was 32 per car. The 106 DM cars (Nos 5501-5606) were each coupled to one of 106 T (Nos 6501-6606) forming semi-permanent two-car units, with an automatic coupler at each end. Three such units were then marshalled as six-car trains for normal service. The DM cars were slightly longer to accommodate the drivers' cabs, the saloon dimensions in all other respects being the same.

To replace the CO/CP stock on the Edgware Road to Wimbledon section of the District line, a further eleven trains designated C77 were ordered of identical layout. The 33 DM (Nos 5701-5733) and T (Nos 6701-6733) were also formed as 2 car units and could and did interrun with C69. The first was delivered in July 1977, and entered service in December 1977. The class received the Class 499/1 designation on British Rail's TOPS system to operate on the Wimbledon line.

Equipment as built included load sensing "Metacone" air suspension, rheostatic braking, hydraulic parking brake, pneumatic camshaft control by GEC and Brush DC motors of type LT117, with each Dm car having four motors. Air supply was by Reavell reciprocating compressors and braking equipment was by Westinghouse. The guard's door controls were in the driver's cab; this eased conversion to one-person operation in 1984, the first LU line to do so.

One additional DM car was added to the C77 order to replace C69 DM car 5585, which had been damaged in the West Ham station attack in March 1976. The replacement DM car retained the 5585 number and 5585-6585 therefore became a hybrid C69/C77 unit.

Unit 5606–6606, which had been used for various equipment trials, was scrapped in 1993. Cars 6505 and 6713 were damaged in the 7 July 2005 London bombings and were scrapped above the solebar. The remains were used in the building of new cars 6606 (the second car with this number) and 6734 as C08 stock. They were paired with 5505 and 5713, renumbered 5606 and 5734 to match their partners. 5548+6548 were rebuilt in part following the bombings.

== Design ==
The stock was made up of three two-car units, a 16.03-metre (52 ft 7 in) driving motor and a 14.97-metre (49 ft 1 in) trailer, each with four pairs of doors on each side and seating 32 people. The stock had a public address system and rheostatic brakes on the driving motor. Although there were technical differences, units of different ages could be coupled together and since the 1991–94 refurbishment there were no visual differences. The stock was unpainted until refurbishment, then painted red, white and blue.

== Refurbishment ==
In 1989, the hybrid C69/C77 unit 5585-6585 was chosen as the prototype unit to undergo a trial refurbishment, which was carried out by British Rail Engineering Limited's Derby Litchurch Lane Works. The exterior of both cars was painted blue above the waist level and white beneath, with the driving cabs painted red. Inside, the maple wood flooring was replaced by light grey, grooved, moulded flooring, and the non-cab ends were fitted with windows, to improve visibility between cars and improve passenger safety. Trailer car 6585 underwent more substantial changes, with the transverse seating removed and replaced with longitudinal seating, and bulkheads redesigned to remove the illuminated advertisement panels.

The prototype unit was displayed to the public and entered service on 22 November 1989. Following the success of the trial refurbishment, a contract was awarded to RFS Industries of Doncaster to refurbish the entire fleet.

Additionally, after the refurbishment scheme, the whole fleet had their cab windows replaced with missile-proof glass; this accounts for the black surrounds to the windows which, when the centre windows were still awaiting replacement, earned the trains the nickname “Pandas”.

Yellow Pages, in collaboration with advertising agency Rufus Leonard, launched a multi-million pound advertising campaign with London Transport by painting and vinyl-wrapping a six-car C Stock train. The interior seats were also given a unique moquette, featuring lines of Yellow Pages' classification headings. The painted C Stock train was launched at High Street Kensington on 12 February 1998 and ran in service on the Circle line until autumn 1999.

== Numbering ==
C69 Stock DMs were numbered 5501-5606 plus trailers 6501-6606; C77 Stock 5585(2), 5701–5733, 6701-6733 and renumbered 5734; C08s Stock 6606(2) and 6734. Two non-power cars (6605 & 6713) were damaged in the 7 July 2005 London bombings and subsequently rebuilt.

As delivered, the numbering system composed of the following vehicle numbers:

Formation		Reversible units		Notes
Formation		5xxx (DM)	6xxx (UT)	Notes
Numbers	C69	5501 : 5606	6501 : 6606(1)	5585(1) destroyed in 1976.; 6505 partly destroyed in 2005 - rebuilt as 6606(2); 5505 renumbered 5606(2) in 2008
Numbers	C77	5701 : 5733	6701 : 6733	6713 partly destroyed in 2005 - rebuilt as 6734; 5713 renumbered 5734 in 2008.
Numbers	C08		6606(2); 6734	

- DM - Driving Motor car
- UT - Uncoupling Trailer (non-powered) car

== Withdrawal ==
The stock was replaced between 2012 and 2014 by S7 Stock. Set 5595+6595 was cannibalised in 2011 as a trial programme, and resulted in a planned withdrawal until 2014. In July 2012 sets 5532+6532 and 5575+6575 were damaged beyond economical repair in a side-swipe at Hammersmith depot. They were sent to the Northwood sidings on 15 October 2012, and taken to Eastleigh Works to be scrapped.

Final withdrawal of the C Stock commenced on 2 January 2013, when the first full 6-car train, 5515+6515, 5519+6519 and 5732+6732, was taken to Northwood sidings and loaded on lorries to be scrapped. A withdrawal was made every week or two until 2014, but because of delays to the introduction of S7 Stock owing to modifications needed to be made to the S8 Stock, the withdrawal process was temporarily halted.

On 26 April 2013, the process resumed, with 5528+5588+5701 being transferred to Acton Works for removal from the system. The C stock was completely withdrawn on the Circle and Hammersmith & City lines by 11 February 2014. At the time of its replacement with the S Stock, the C stock was described by Transport for London as being "in an increasingly poor state".

On 3 June 2014, the final scheduled working of C Stock on the London Underground system took place, consisting of 5533/6533+5517/6517+5592/6592, operating train 074. Unfortunately, the last journey was cut short by four hours and ended at 9:30am, with the train going to Hammersmith Depot instead.

A railtour took place on 29 June 2014 traversing much of the mileage covered by the stock during its working life. One train (5721+5531+5578) was retained for this tour with one held as a reserve in case of breakdown (5533+5517+5592).

The penultimate train, which was the reserve train for the tour (5533+5517+5592), was taken to Ealing Common Depot on 4 July 2014 and loaded onto trucks to be scrapped at CF Booth, Rotherham, the same place where many A Stock and C Stock trains were scrapped. The final train, the railtour train (5721+5531+5578), was taken to Ealing Common Depot on 9 July 2014 to be scrapped at Rotherham as well. Only car 5721 was preserved at the London Transport Museum's Acton depot.

=== Post-withdrawal use ===
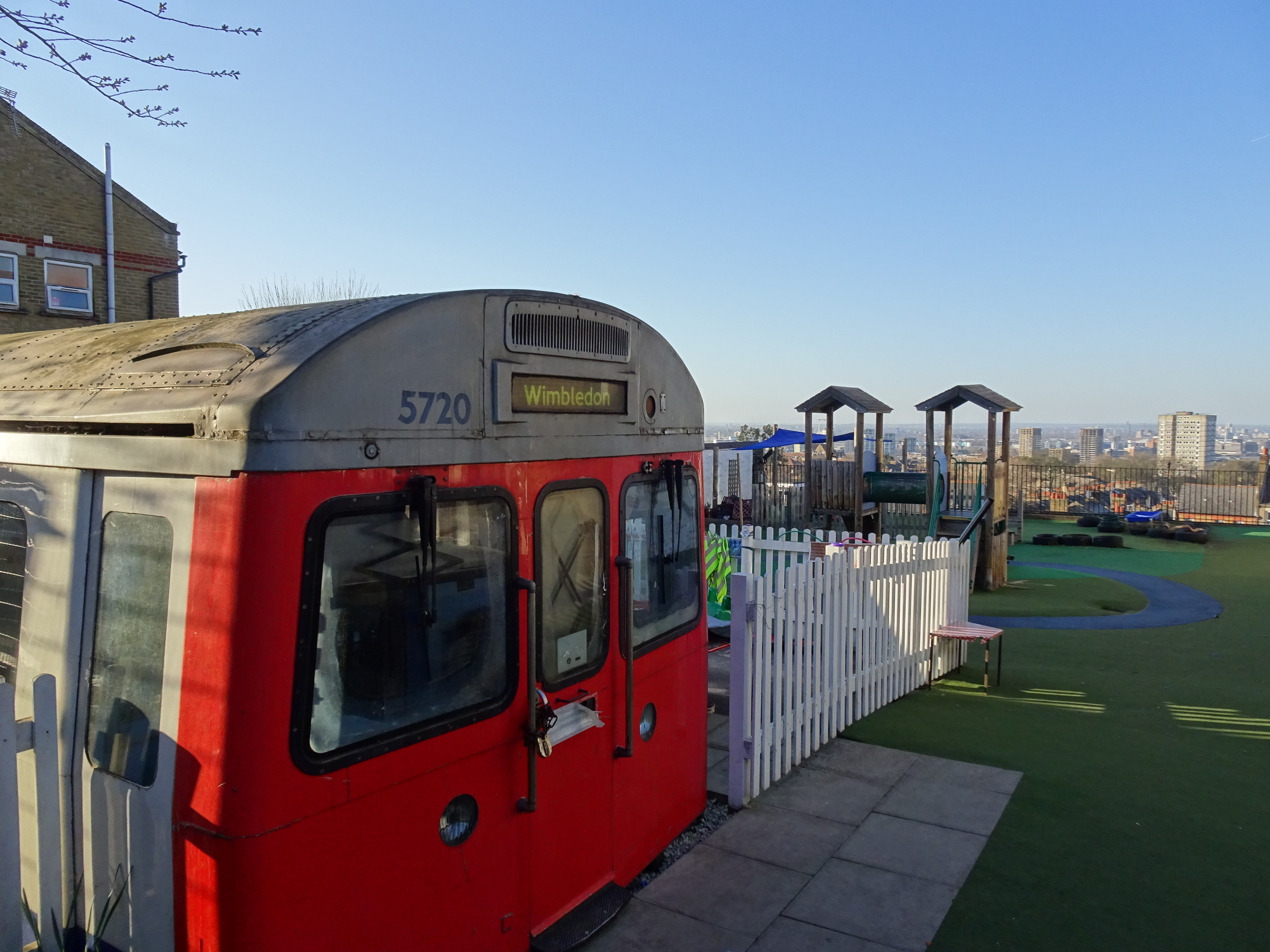
C77 Stock driving motor car No.5720 at Plumcroft Primary School

Transport for London has donated two C77 driving motors to educational establishments, and another from the same sub-series to the London Transport Museum: these were 5701, 5720 and 5721.

Sub-series	Car number(s)	Notes
C77 Stock	5701	Donated by Transport for London to the Royal Greenwich UTC on 28 June 2013.
C77 Stock	5720	Donated by TfL to Plumcroft Primary School, Plumstead.
C77 Stock	5721	Static exhibit at the London Transport Museum's Acton depot.
