= Acton Works =

London Underground depot

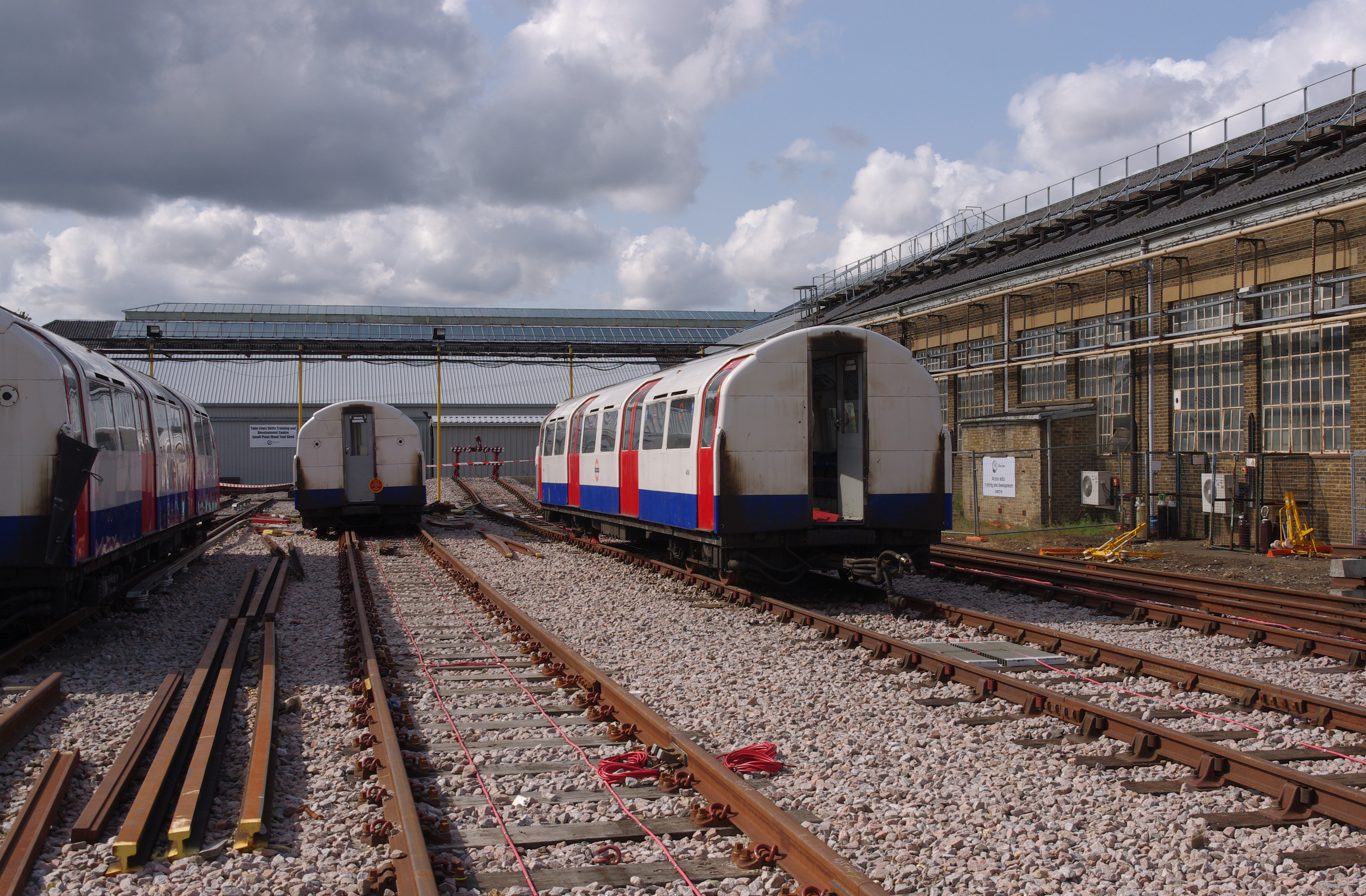
- 1967 Stock cars in use at Acton Works for training of the Emergency Response Unit.
- Interactive map of Acton Works

Location
- Location: Ealing, United Kingdom
- Coordinates: 51.498°N 0.278°W
- OS grid: TQ196790

Characteristics
- Owner: London Underground
- Type: Tube and Sub-surface Stock

History
- Opened: 1922

Acton Works is a London Underground maintenance facility in West London, England. It is accessed from the District line and Piccadilly line tracks to the east of Acton Town station, and was opened in 1922. It was responsible for the overhaul of rolling stock, and gradually took on this role for more lines, until the formation of the London Passenger Transport Board in 1933, when all major overhauls of underground vehicles were carried out at the works. By 1985, when rolling stock had become more reliable and maintenance intervals had increased, this function was devolved to depots on each line. Subsequently, Acton continued to overhaul major items after they had been removed from trains at the depots, and tendered for work, which included the conversion of the A60 Stock to One Person Operation. It is likely to be reorganised and expanded to house the departments displaced from Lillie Bridge Depot which is being demolished as part of the redevelopment of Earls Court Exhibition Centre.

The site housed the engineering design department for London Underground, and under the leadership of charismatic figures like William Sebastian Graff-Baker from 1922 until 1952 and Stan Driver in the 1960s, produced a series of elegant and innovative designs for batches of rolling stock. The department's nadir was the design of the 1983 Stock, which was produced without any input from an outside design agency. The stock was less than successful, and resulted in a decision that design agencies would always be involved in future rolling stock development.

Major rolling stock projects carried out at the works have included the refurbishment of 15 of the Metropolitan Railway electric locomotives in 1953, and the conversion of the experimental 1960 Stock for Automatic Train Operation trials on the Woodford to Hainault section of the Central line, in preparation for its use on the Victoria line. The works has also been the home of several works shunters. Two were made from redundant driving motor cars, cut in half and joined back to back. A third consisted of two cars of 1935 Stock, which had been converted at the works in 1969 for articulation trials, and acted as a shunter after the trials were completed. A fourth shunter was built by modifying two driving motor cars of 1938 Stock.

== History ==
Acton Works was conceived as a central overhaul workshop for the London Underground, and the first part of it was opened in 1922. It was designed to allow the overhaul of around 16 cars per week, and initially serviced cars from the District line, the Piccadilly line and the Bakerloo line. Motor cars entered the works for major overhaul every 50,000 miles (80,000 km), or approximately once a year, while trailer cars were overhauled less frequently, after they had run around 70,000 miles (110,000 km). Subsequently, the works was expanded, to enable it to cope with the overhaul of 60 cars per week. Rather than just the three lines, the cars came from all of the lines run by London Underground, although the Metropolitan line remained independent for longer than the rest. Facilities for the repair of bodywork and repainting were also added. The works did not overhaul cars from the Northern line until 1927, when a new underground junction was constructed at King's Cross to allow transfer of the vehicles, while transferring cars from the Bakerloo line involved a circuitous route via Willesden Junction and Earl's Court, until the line was extended to Stanmore in 1939. Maintenance of Metropolitan line trains moved from Neasden Depot to Acton Works in 1933, when the London Passenger Transport Board was formed.

Cars for overhaul would arrive at a small platform near the trimming shop, where the seats would be removed for refurbishment. At the lifting shop, the car body would be lifted off its original bogies, and mounted onto accommodation bogies, which provided much more clearance below the car, so that items below the car floor could be accessed more easily. A system of haulage chains, mounted in channels underneath the workshop floors, was used to move the car bodies through the various workshops. Dirt and accumulated debris was removed by high-pressure air jets, before insulation testing of the electrical circuits was carried out. A traverser moved the body to one road of the car body shop, where there were facilities for removing and maintaining reciprocating compressors, door engines and valves, brake valves, drawgear, electrical equipment and other items requiring servicing. Cars then moved to the paint shop, until the advent of unpainted aluminium bodywork.

In a separate workstream, the service bogies were stripped down into their component parts. Motors were taken to the motor shop, and when only the frames and wheelsets were left, ultrasonic testing of the axles was carried out. Badly worn tyres were removed, and new tyres fitted to the wheel centres. If the wear was less severe, the wheels were turned on a lathe to restore their profile. Once all the parts had been serviced, the bogies were reassembled on a conveyor, and stored until needed. The motor shop included facilities for complete reconditioning of traction motors, including rewinding armatures, and baking them at high temperatures to drive out all traces of moisture and harden the insulating varnish. Returning to the lifting shop, the motors were remounted in the bogies, and the car bodies were transferred back onto the service bogies, before final testing and the replacement of the seats. The works included a reconstruction shop, which was used for modernising old stock, or altering non-standard cars so that they more nearly matched a particular class of stock. There was also an experimental shop, which produced mock-ups of new designs, and a machine shop, where component parts for the repair or refurbishment of major items were made.

=== Changing roles ===
The requirements for major overhauls gradually reduced, as equipment became more reliable. The interval at which cars received a heavy overhaul increased from every four years to every nine. In 1947, the first underfloor wheel lathes were installed, which allowed wheel flanges to be machined without removing the bogies from the cars. In 1961, a lathe was installed at Northfields depot which could reprofile the whole wheel, without uncoupling individual cars, and this became standard practice. Improved insulation used in the manufacture of motors meant that armatures did not need to be rewound, while the use of aluminium body panels meant that the paint shop became redundant. By 1985, much of the equipment at Acton needed replacing, and London Underground took the decision to devolve the overhaul of cars to the depots on each line. The works was still responsible for the overhaul of some equipment, after it had been removed from cars at the depots.

Subsequently, Acton Works quoted for engineering projects, such as the conversion of the A60 Stock to One Person Operation. They won the contract, and most of the work was carried out at the works, although some was performed at Ruislip depot. Although much of the works was disused after 1985, a new Equipment Overhaul Workshop was created in 1989. The following year, a Depot Engineering Support Unit (DESU) opened at Ealing Common Depot, located on sidings at its eastern end, but this was short-lived, and the functions of the Support Unit were relocated back to Acton Works soon afterwards, with the building at Ealing Common being used to store items from the London Transport Museum's collection.

London Underground have been looking at options for Lillie Bridge Depot since 2010, as it is due to be redeveloped as part of the Earls Court Exhibition Centre site, and have decided that most of the workshops can be moved to Acton. Departments which will be affected by the move are Maintenance Infrastructure Services, the Track Manufacturing Division, the Track Delivery Unit, and Plant Services, which covers workshops and stores. It is likely that, as a result of the reconfiguration of the site to accommodate this, the Emergency Response Unit will be relocated away from Acton Works.

=== Personnel ===
From its beginning, Acton Works had been the responsibility of William Sebastian Graff-Baker, who had been born in England in 1889 to American parents. After studying in England, he went to the Johns Hopkins University in Maryland and Washington, D.C., and returned to England, where in 1909 he became a junior fitter for the Metropolitan District Railway, the forerunner of the District line. By 1913, he was in charge of all lifts and escalators for the underground network, and by 1921 had responsibility for all of the rolling stock depots. In 1922, he was appointed to the post of assistant mechanical engineer, and became the chief mechanical engineer in 1934. He had a great flair for design and invention, and led the team at Acton, who were responsible for train design, development and other experimental work.

In the 1930s, the designs for the Streamlined 1935 Stock emerged from Acton, and although the streamlining was less than successful, they were also responsible for the design of the 1938 Stock for which it was effectively a prototype. Next, they turned their attention to the sub-surface stock, producing elegant designs for what became the O, P and Q38 Stock. During the Second World War, many of the engineers at Acton were granted 'reserved occupation' status, which meant that they were not called up to serve in the armed forces. Graff-Baker, however, was seconded to the Ministry of Supply, becoming the Deputy Director General of Tank Production. With hostilities ended, he returned to Acton Works, and under his leadership, great designs continued to be produced.

London Transport had built numbers of Halifax bombers during the war, and so had gained experience with duraluminium panels. This was put to use in the design of the R Stock, built to replace trains with manually operated doors on the Circle and District lines. Early vehicles had steel bodywork, and were painted, but subsequent vehicles, known as R49 Stock, used aluminium alloy for the body panels and underframes. They were similar in appearance to the O and P Stock, produced prior to the war. For the sub-surface lines, the next design produced by the design team was the A60 Stock for the Metropolitan line. For the tube lines, Graff-Baker was keen to try out new ideas, particularly to improve visibility for standing passengers. A 1938 Stock driving motor car was remodelled at Acton in 1949, with windows and the glazing of the doors carried upwards into the roof. Prior to the re-equipping of the Piccadilly line, a full scale mockup of half of a car of 1952 Stock was produced at Acton, incorporating the new glazing and other features. Sadly, Graff-Baker died suddenly on the way to work in 1952, and most of his innovations were dropped. The design team pulled out the drawings for the 1938 Stock, and they formed the basic design for the experimental 1956 Stock and the subsequent production run of 1959 Stock. Glazing of the doors above the eaves would have to wait until the 1967 Stock was designed for the Victoria line.

=== Collaboration ===
By the mid-1960s, Acton's Rolling Stock Design Office had a new head, in Stan Driver, who had cultivated a good working relationship with Misha Black and James Williamns. They had created the Design Research Unit (DRU) in 1943, which had risen to become the largest multi-disciplinary design company in Britain. They worked on the concepts and general arrangements for the interior of the 1967 Stock, while Acton concentrated on the engineering aspects of the design. The result of this cooperation was another stylish design, which included windows extending up above the roof line in the doors. This concept had been championed by Alec Valentine, a member of the London Transport Board, when Graff-Baker had suggested it for the 1952 Stock, and now that he was Sir Alec Valentine and chairman of the Board, he made sure it happened. The 1973 Stock designed for the Piccadilly line at the time of the Heathrow extension, was another collaboration between the Acton team and the Design Research Unit, and the elegant lines and attention to detail of the finished trains was highly praised by Martin Pawley, the architectural commentator for the Architects' Journal, in the April 1987 edition. The Design Research Unit had been excluded from working on the interior, which showed no fresh concepts, and the provision for luggage for travellers to the airport was poorly thought out.

Around 1970, the Northern line gained a reputation for poor service and reliability. This was partly due to the aged 1938 Stock then running on the line, but was exacerbated by strike action by maintenance staff at Acton Works, which resulted in there being a shortage of rotary air compressors to keep the trains running. In response to pressure from Horace Cutler, the chairman of the Greater London Council's Policy and Resource Committee, an order was placed for 1972 Stock, which was essentially the same as 1967 Stock, but with operating panels for guards fitted into one end of the driving motor cars. The lack of design meant that they were unsuitable for use on the Northern line on a number of counts, and the lack of a cab door for the driver caused particular problems. When new trains were required for the Jubilee line in the early 1980s, the team at Acton designed the 1983 Stock, without any involvement from a design agency. The result was lacklustre, and there were long-running reliability problems with the single-leaf doors and the bogies, which resulted in them lasting for only 15 years, before scrapping began. One result was that the London Transport Design Committee insisted that a design agency should be involved in all future plans for rolling stock. The Acton engineers worked with DCA Design Consultants from October 1982, on a small prototype run of trains for the upgrading of the Central line, and three trains of 1986 Stock were ordered. Many innovative features were tried out, and after extensive market research, the best features were incorporated into the 1992 Stock.

=== Rolling stock ===
Between 1908 and 1910, the District Railway carried out a number of engineering projects, to improve the service which they provided. This enabled trains to run more frequently, and to meet the demand, three batches of stock were purchased. 32 motor cars and 20 trailers of C Stock were ordered in 1910 from Hurst Nelson of Motherwell, Scotland. The second batch was built in 1912 by the Metropolitan Amalgamated Railway Carriage and Wagon Company, and consisted of 22 motor cars and eight trailers, known as D Stock. The Gloucester Railway Carriage and Wagon Company built the E Stock, which comprised 26 motor cars and four trailers. Under the 1928 Reconstruction Programme, all of the trailer cars from the three batches were converted into motor cars at Acton Works.

From 1932, the line between Acton Town and South Acton was operated as a shuttle service, using a B Stock motor car which had been provided with a second cab at the trailing end. Under the 1935-1940 New Works Programme, it was intended to retain this vehicle, but as all other cars of B Stock were being scrapped, Acton Works converted two G Stock motor cars, built in 1923, for this duty. The work involved constructing a drivers cab at the trailing end, and fitting duplicate brake cylinders and triple valves. Controls for operation of the doors by air were added, and an interlock ensured that the driver was shut in the cab before traction control could be obtained. The conversion was completed at the works in 1939, and the cars operated for another 20 years until the service was withdrawn. After a while, the control circuits were modified, to limit the speed on the short curved branch, so that only the series notches on the controller could be used, rather than all of the series-parallel notches.

After a review of District line rolling stock was completed in 1926, purchasing of new stock began. In 1931 eight motor cars and 37 trailers were ordered from the Union Construction Company, which were known as L Stock. The motor cars were handed and faced west, but to make up the trains, six east-facing motor cars were required. Acton therefore took six motor cars of B Stock, altered the control connections and the air lines, and made other minor alterations to enable them to operate as east-facing cars. The L Stock was the first sub-surface stock to be delivered with roller bearings on the traction motors, and the previous batches of K Stock passed through Acton Works to have the white metal bearings replaced with roller bearings.

When planning for the O and P Stock, to replace older stock on the Metropolitan and District lines, consideration was given to a new type of control which Metropolitan Vickers were developing. The Metadyne system was therefore fitted to six old Metropolitan cars, dating from between 1904 and 1907. Acton converted the cars in pairs, one receiving the rotary transformer equipment and the other a motor-generator set to provide a low-voltage supply for control and lighting. Each metadyne machine could power four motors, and so each pair of cars had to work together, as each only contained two motors. After extensive trials, most of the O and P Stock was ordered with Metadyne control, and was the first use of regenerative braking on the Underground.

In 1921-23, the Metropolitan Railway had ordered 20 electric locomotives for the locomotive-hauled services which they ran on the northern reaches of the line. They were fitted with nameplates in 1926, but these were removed during the Second World War, and the locomotives were painted in battleship grey. By 1953, 15 of the locomotives were still operational, and Acton Works carried out major restoration work, including reinstating the maroon livery and the nameplates. In the early 1960s, they ceased to be used on passenger trains, when the A60 Stock multiple units replaced them, but four were retained for shunting duties, and No. 5 John Hampden was assigned to Acton Works, until it was scrapped in 1973.

=== Experimental development ===
Conversion of the prototype batch of 1960 Stock for Automatic Train Operation trials on the Woodford to Hainault section of the Central line, in preparation for its use on the Victoria line, took place at Acton from late 1963. Major work included sealing up the drivers cab doors, moving the door controls into the cabs, fitting a public address system, and changing the automatic couplers at the outer ends to mechanical ones. Trials of the converted trains began on 5 April 1964.

After major overhauls were devolved to line depots in 1985, Acton Works carried out most of the conversion of the Metropolitan A60 Stock for One Person Operation, although a small number of units were converted at Ruislip depot. Driving motor cars at the outer ends of units were fitted with missile-proof windscreens, door opening controls, and high-intensity headlights. The work took place between April 1985 and September 1986, with the changeover to One Person Operation occurring on the Metropolitan line on 29 September 1986. In order to combat problems of leaves on the line during the autumn, particularly on the northern reaches beyond Rickmansworth, trailer car 6036 was fitted with Sandite dispensers, to become a Rail Adhesion Car. Sandite is applied to the running rails, to improve adhesion, and the conversion work was performed at Acton in 1986. During the autumn months, the car is inserted into the middle of a four-car unit, to make a five-car unit.

A two-car unit of C69 Stock was damaged by a bomb at West Ham in 1976. Driving motor car 5585 could not be repaired and was scrapped, but trailer car 6585 was repaired at Acton, and ran with a motor car from a second batch of similar trains ordered in 1977. London Underground experimented with two all-over-advert trains, including a three-car C69 unit, which advertised Yellow Pages from 12 February 1998. The vinyl adverts were removed in May 1999, after which it was moved to Acton in August, where repainting in corporate livery was completed in November. Acton also carried out a trial refurbishment of a D78 Stock trailer car in 1999. This involved replacing all of the interior, and cutting windows in the ends of the car, to improve passenger security. Tip-up seats were provided at one end of the car, so that users in wheelchairs could be accommodated. Without end windows in the adjacent cars, the new windows would have been pointless, and so two further cars had them fitted, although the interiors were not upgraded. When completed, all three cars were in corporate livery, applied as a vinyl overlay.

=== Shunting locomotives ===
Acton has had a number of shunting locomotives over the years. The first was L10, converted in 1930 from the driving ends of two gate stock motor cars displaced from the Hampstead line. The control equipment was left unaltered, but adjustable couplings were fitted at both ends. These could be moved up or down to allow the vehicle to couple to tube stock or sub-surface stock. The works can only be approached from one end, and the locomotive had a designated Ealing end, facing away from the works, and an Acton end, facing towards it. The coupling at the Ealing end was seldom used, and was gradually cannibalised to keep the Acton end operational. The locomotive was required to move individual cars around the works, and to make up trains once their overhaul had been completed. The original GE69 motors were subsequently replaced with more powerful GE212 types, and the vehicle was scrapped on 30 September 1978. In 1964, the works produced a second shunting locomotive of similar construction, using two 1931 Stock motor cars. The Ealing end retained its Ward coupler, while the Acton end was fitted with two Ward couplers, one at tube height and one at sub-surface height. The vehicle was fitted with sanding gear, to assist it when moving four-car units up the steep bank to Acton Town from the works, and equipment which had been mounted below the car floor was moved into the remains of the passenger space, where possible, to make maintenance easier. Numbered L11, it entered service in maroon livery on 19 November 1964, effectively replacing L10. It was repainted in yellow in 1983, and was preserved by Cravens Heritage Trains in 2004, when it was moved to Epping station by road.

On 15 May 1969, two redundant driving motor cars of 1935 Stock were moved from Ruislip depot to Acton Works, for articulation trials. The trailing ends were cut back, and the two cars were mounted on three new bogies. The unit was subjected to testing for a year from August 1970, and after the trials, was retained as a works shunter, because the shoegear spanned over 64 feet (20 m), which meant that it could cross long gaps in the current rail at slow speeds. The cars were numbered L14A and L14B, and it remained in use until early 1975, when the outer bogies were removed for other purposes, and the rest was broken up at the works. The advantage of its length was realised, and a two-car shunting locomotive was constructed out of two redundant 1938 Stock driving motor cars in 1974. The cars were numbered L13A and L13B, and were fitted with reciprocating compressors, with power lines between the cars to maintain the advantage of the shoegear spanning long gaps.
