= Hainault Depot =

London Underground railway depot on the Central line

Hainault depot
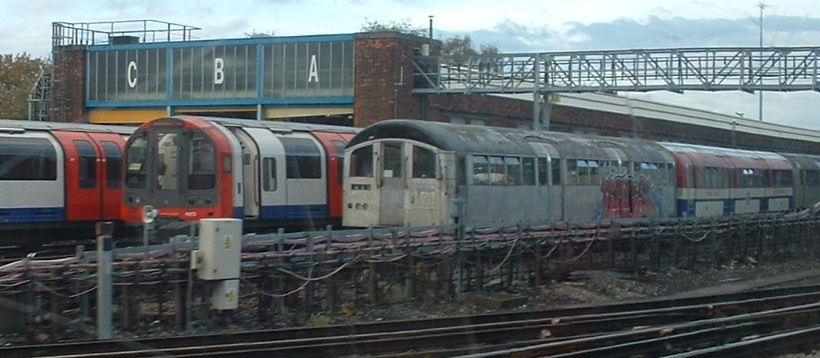
- A Departmental train of 1962 stock at Hainault Depot with two trains of 1992 stock on the left
- Interactive map of Hainault depot

Location
- Location: Redbridge, United Kingdom
- Coordinates: 51.61°N 0.09°E

Characteristics
- Owner: London Underground
- Type: Tube stock

History
- Opened: 1947

Hainault depot is a traction maintenance depot in Ilford on the London Underground Central line, between Hainault and Grange Hill stations, now in the London Borough of Redbridge, England. Until boundary changes in 1998, part of the depot was in Epping Forest District. Construction began in 1939, but was delayed by the onset of the Second World War, and was not completed until 1948. It has stabled three generations of trains, Standard stock, 1962 stock and 1992 stock. It has also housed trains of the experimental 1960 stock, both when it was conventionally controlled and during trials of Automatic Train Operation (ATO) in preparation for the construction of the Victoria line. Some of the 1967 stock destined for the Victoria line was also stabled at the depot while its ATO equipment was tested and commissioned on the Woodford to Hainault Branch.

Until the advent of the 1992 stock, the depot faced a particular problem caused by the Hainault loop, and the fact that underground stock was handed. Trains could enter the depot from the Woodford direction or the Newbury Park direction. To prevent operational problems caused by the handedness, trains normally had to re-enter service in the same direction as they had left service, and reforming of trains within the depot was complicated by trains facing in both directions. In addition to service trains, the depot hosted a train of 1960 stock, owned by Cravens Heritage Trains, during the 1990s, and still hosts a train of 1962 stock, owned by the same group. The 1960 stock train was moved to Ruislip depot when the Central Line was upgraded for Automatic Train Protection and a new system of ATO in 1996, but the 1962 stock is being restored at Hainault.

== History ==
Following its formation in 1933, the London Passenger Transport Board introduced a five-year New Works Programme, due to run from 1935 to 1940. A major part of this was extensions to the Central Line, both in the west to Ruislip, and in the east, to Leytonstone, Woodford, Epping and Ongar, partially using tracks which belonged to the London and North Eastern Railway. The extensions, which would create a route mileage of 45 miles (72 km), meant that new depots would be required for the extra trains needed, and they were to be located at Ruislip and Hainault. Work began, but none of the Central Line extensions were completed before the outbreak of the Second World War, leaving the partially completed Hainault depot detached from the railway it was designed to serve.

During the hostilities, the depot was used by the War Office and the U.S. Army Transportation Corps assembled rolling stock there between 1943 and 1945. It was also used as a temporary storage location for 190 cars of standard stock, which had been displaced by deliveries of 1938 stock during the war years. After the war, there was a shortage of money, materials and labour, and the rebuilding of the housing stock took priority over the remainder of the New Works Programme. However, the extensions to the Central Line were given top priority, and over the next four years, most were completed, with electric trains reaching Hainault and its depot from Newbury Park on 31 May 1948, and from Woodford on 21 November 1949. Although tracks had been laid by 1939, the entire depot, which was designed to handle 344 cars, had to be equipped and electrified. Parts of it became operational in 1947, and it was fully operational in 1948.

The New Works Programme had included the purchase of 1,121 cars of 1938 stock, none of which were scheduled for use on the Central Line. All of the platforms on the Central Line had been lengthened to take 8-car trains, as part of the Programme, and the intention was that as the 1938 stock was delivered to the Northern and Bakerloo lines, the displaced standard stock would be refurbished at Acton Works for use on the Central Line. The transferred rolling stock was formed into 7-car trains. As traffic on the extended line built up, it soon became obvious that 7-car trains did not have adequate capacity for peak hour crowds, and some 8-car trains were assembled. The purchase of the 1949 stock released further cars so that there were 52 8-car trains working on the line, and the arrival of London Underground 1959 Stock enabled this process to be completed, so that by September 1960, Hainault had its full complement of 43 8-car trains.

Hainault depot faced a particular problem, because it is located on the Hainault loop, and all Underground trains prior to 1960 were "handed". They had an "A" end and a "D" end, and in normal operation, an "A" end of one train can only be coupled to a "D" end of another. Problems can arise in an emergency if there is a mix of "right way" and "wrong way" trains, and in order to minimise this, Hainault station acted as a terminus for trains arriving from Newbury Park and from Woodford. Despite this, in the depot it was necessary to ensure that trains re-entered service in the same direction as they had been stabled, so that a train leaving service from the Woodford direction had to re-enter service in that direction. The presence of trains facing both directions also presented problems when re-forming trains in the depot, which was minimised by carrying additional spare rolling stock.

The 1960 stock was designed to solve the problems of handedness, as extra wires were provided in the electrical couplers to make them fully reversible. Twelve motor cars were ordered and were assembled into six 4-car units, by modifying 2 extra standard stock trailers for each 4-car train. It was expected that these would be the first of 350 motor cars and the same number of converted trailers, for the complete upgrade of the Central Line, but the standard stock was proving to be increasingly unreliable, and there was insufficient time to assess the new prototypes. Instead, 57 trains of newly built 1959 stock were diverted from the Piccadilly line as an interim measure, and increased from seven cars to eight by ordering an extra 57 non-driving motor cars. Many of these were stabled at Hainault depot, until the delivery of 1962 stock, which was virtually identical to the 1959 stock. A total of 87 and a half 8-car trains were ordered, the first entering service on 12 April 1962, and by 17 May 1964, all of the 1959 stock had left the depot and been returned to the Piccadilly Line. The 1962 stock was still handed, with "A" and "D" ends, and so the problems of stabling them and managing them in the depot remained.

Following initial trials of automatic train control on the District Line in 1963, five of the six 4-car units of 1960 stock were altered for a full-scale trial on the Woodford to Hainault branch. The intention was to ensure that such control was reliable by the time it was introduced on the Victoria Line, then under construction. Part of the conversion process involved the provision of a trip valve instead of a trip cock for emergency stopping of the train, but the trip cocks were retained, so that the trains could operate on tracks which were not equipped for automatic train operation, and the train stops on the Woodford to Hainault branch were retained, as conventional trains still had to use the branch to reach Hainault depot. The five units were stabled in the depot, and a maximum of four were used on the Woodford to Hainault experiments at any one time, with the first train running on 5 April 1964. By 1974, the standard stock trailers were becoming a maintenance liability, and three of the units had their two trailers replaced by a single modified 1938 stock trailer. Because of the cost of the conversion, the trailers of the remaining two units were refurbished, which included repainting in white, rather than aluminium, at the depot.

The depot also stored 1967 stock when it was first delivered. 4-car units arrived at Ruislip depot from the manufacturers, and were prepared for service there. They were then transferred to Hainault depot, where they were tested on the Woodford to Hainault branch. Once this was completed, the trains were transferred from the depot to Northumberland Park by battery locomotives, using the connection to British Rail's Eastern Region at Leyton. Units of 1967 stock were occasionally stabled at the depot after the Victoria Line had opened, to allow modification or overhaul of the 1960 stock. The next change occurred between 7 April 1993 and 17 February 1995, as the 1962 stock was withdrawn, to be replaced by 1992 stock. This consisted of four types of car, driving motor cars, designated as type 'A', and three variations of non-driving motor cars, designated as types 'B', 'C' and 'D'. These are formed into 2-car units, initially A+B, B+C or B+D, and 8-car trains are formed of four units, made up of any combination of available units, with a driving motor car at the outer ends. Crucially for the operation of the depot, all 2-car units are fully reversible, like the 1960 stock, enabling 8-car trains to be assembled with units facing in either direction, while trains entering the depot from the Woodford direction can re-enter service towards Newbury Park without causing operational difficulties.

The depot has also been used for the stabling of other types of stock from time to time. In 2002, four 4-car units of 1972 Mk 1 stock were stored there following withdrawal from the Northern Line, pending a decision on their future. A 3-car unit was also stored there, prior to scrapping.

== Preservation ==
In addition to the operational stock for the Central Line, two trains of privately owned stock have been based at the depot. Cravens Heritage Trains bought a 3-car train of 1960 stock, and this was stabled at Hainault following its use as the final train on the Epping to Ongar branch. Maintenance work on it was undertaken at the depot, and a series of rail tours were run on the eastern end of the Central Line during 1995 and 1996. It was moved to Ruislip depot, when the Central Line signalling was upgraded for Automatic Train Protection and Automatic Train Operation, which meant that the preserved unit could no longer operate on the Central Line, as it was not compatible with the new system. Cravens Heritage Trains also own a 4-car unit of 1962 stock, which remains at the depot, where it is being restored.

== Geography ==
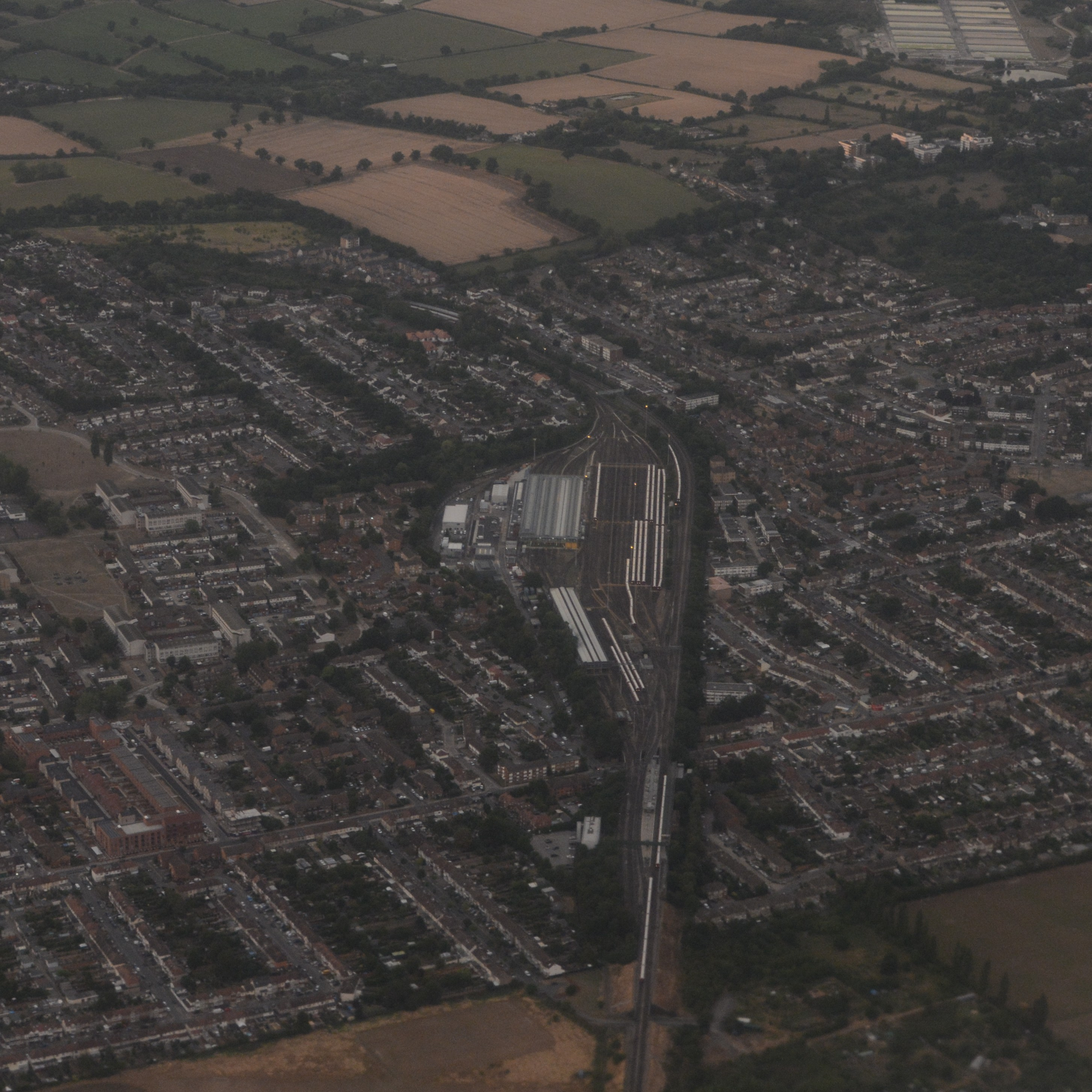
Hainault depot from the air, looking towards the north. 2018.

Having run broadly west to east from Roding Valley through Chigwell to Grange Hill, the Hainault loop turns to the south to reach Hainault station. The depot is situated to the west of the loop, with the northern entrance turning off from the Central Line a little to the south of Grange Hill. Access to the loop at the southern end of the depot is to the north of Hainault station. The border between the county of Essex and the London Borough of Redbridge runs along the line of the railway from Grange Hill, and then runs along the western perimeter fence, before turning to the west before reaching the southern end of the site. Part of the depot site was in Essex until boundary alterations in 1998.

The basic layout of the depot has changed very little throughout its history. In 2002, there was a train washing line immediately to the west of the service lines, followed by fifteen open-air sidings for stabling trains. To the west of those was a 9-road shed for stabling, and a couple of sidings near the administration block. Four of the carriage shed lines were only accessible from the northern end, while the westernmost five were through roads, which converged to run through a 3-road cleaning shed, further to the south. A second train washing machine was located to the south of that on one of the exit roads. The 1938 Ordnance Survey map shows the carriage shed, with the tracks at the northern end, and some of the stabling sidings next to the carriage shed. The structure of the cleaning shed is shown, but no tracks are connected to it.

== See also ==
- Ruislip depot
- White City depot
