= London Underground 1935 Stock =

Experimental stock

1935 Stock
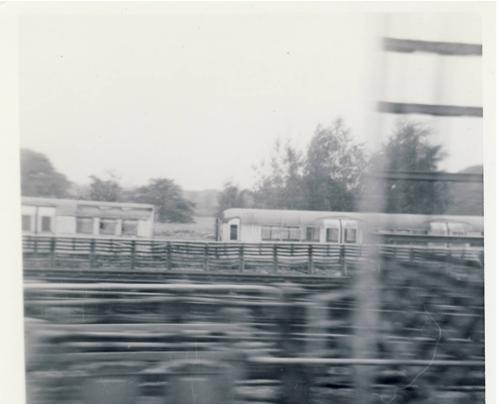
- A 1935 Stock driving motor and a 1927 trailer at Ruislip depot in 1971. Both were scrapped less than 2 months later.
- In service: 1936–1976
- Manufacturer: Metro Cammell

Specifications
- Car length: 52 ft 6 in (16.00 m)
- Width: 8 ft 6 1/4 in (2.597 m)
- Height: 9 ft 5 1/2 in (2.883 m)

The London Underground 1935 Stock was an experimental train design by Metropolitan Cammell in London. Twelve two-car units, marshalled into four six-car trains, were built. They served as the prototypes for the later 1938 Stock.

Three of these trains had the cars streamlined, based upon trial with a 1923 Standard Stock Control Trailer built by Metropolitan Cammell. The cars in the fourth set had flat fronts almost identical to the later 1938 stock, for which the cars of the 1935 Stock were in effect the prototypes.

These were the first tube cars built for London Underground with the motors and control equipment, etc., under the frame, freeing the space behind the cabs for use by passengers. For evaluation purposes each trainset had different equipment.

The cars were used on the Piccadilly line from 1937 to 1940. During World War II all the 1935 Stock cars were stored at Cockfosters depot. After the war the streamlined cars were sent to Acton works, where they were rebuilt into trailer cars, used with the 1938 stock. They were eventually withdrawn between 1972 and 1976. The unit with the flat fronts re-entered service and was also used with the 1938 stock, the main difference between the 1935 Stock and 1938 stock DMs being that the driver's door on the 1935 stock was taller, extending into the roof.

== History ==
The London Passenger Transport Board was formed by Act of Parliament in 1933, bringing all of London's underground railways under common control. This allowed large-scale planning to be undertaken, and the 1935-1940 New Works Programme included extensions to what became the Northern Line and major extensions at both ends of the Central London Railway, which became the Central Line. The plan envisaged significant purchases of rolling stock, to service the extended lines, and the 1935 Stock was the forerunner for those purchases. Existing motor cars had a switch compartment behind the drivers cab, occupying nearly one third of the car, and this caused particular problems at busy times. Where two motor cars were coupled together in the centre of the train, there was a length of nearly 50 feet (15 m) with no doors for passengers to use.

Prior to placing an order, experiments had been carried out to test various features. A Standard Stock control trailer dating from 1923 had been fitted with a streamlined end. A Tomlinson coupler, which as well as connecting cars together mechanically, also connected the electric and hydraulic systems together automatically, was tried out on two cars, and another had an experimental air-conditioning system fitted. When an order was placed with Metropolitan Cammell for four six-car trains in 1935, variations of all of these features were included in the designs. The trains were supplied as two-car units, permanently coupled together, and three such units made up each six-car train. By careful design, all of the electrical equipment was mounted below the car floor, which meant that the whole length of the motor cars was available for passengers, apart from the drivers cab. A six-car train of the new stock could thus carry as many passengers as a seven-car train of Standard Stock. To meet the second major requirement of improved performance, all of the cars were motor cars.

The inner two axles of each car were fitted with a motor, and adhesion was improved by making the bogies asymmetric. The wheelbase of each bogie was 6.25 feet (1.91 m), but the pivot point was 3.5 feet (1.1 m) from the front axle, resulting in 58 per cent of the weight of the car being used for adhesion. All of the trains were fitted with Crompton Parkinson Type C200 motors, which had been specially designed to fit in the limited space available. They were mounted onto the axle by a roller suspension sleeve. Each motor was rated at 138 horsepower (103 kW), and the car floors sloped upwards at the ends in order to give adequate clearance for the motorised bogies.

Control of the motors used four different systems, one for each six-car train, but all of the systems were compatible, so that any combination of two-car units could be used to form a train. British Thompson-Houston (BTH) provided the only system which was based on previous experience, which became known as the Pneumatic Camshaft Motor (PCM) system. This proved to be the most reliable, and was the system adopted for subsequent batches of trains. The other three systems were new designs, produced by Metropolitan Vickers, General Electric Company, and a collaboration between Crompton Parkinson and Allen West & Co. The PCM system used an air-operated camshaft, to control the switching out of starting resistances. With the motors connected in series, the camshaft rotated in one direction, until no resistances were in circuit. A separate electro-pneumatic switch then controlled the transition from series to parallel configuration, and the camshaft moved back to its starting position, as the resistances were removed again.

Crompton Parkinson provided three different systems, one on each of their two-car units. On the first, two faceplate controllers, driven by 50-volt motors, and an electro-pneumatic camshaft provided 57 notches between rest and full speed. The second system only had one faceplate controller, with the motors permanently connected in parallel, while the third used a motor-driven camshaft to control the switching of the resistances and the transition from series to parallel. The General Electric design used a motor-driven camshaft, which made three complete revolutions between rest and full speed, providing 56 notches. Transition from one notch to the next was based on time, but high motor current could delay the process. The Metropolitan Vickers system used an oil-driver power drum, which ran up to full speed in 45 notches. The resistance bank was reduced in size by using series-parallel switching of the resistances, which also meant that they heated up evenly. All four systems needed a 50-volt supply, and this was provided by a 5 kW motor generator set, which also powered the car lighting.

The first three trains had streamlined cabs fitted at both ends of each two-car unit. The driver's seat was placed in the centre of the semi-elliptical cab, and the armchair seat had the brake and master controller handles on either side, similar to aeroplane joysticks. Drivers did not like the arrangement, and when it was shown that the streamlining would have little effect until speeds of 80 miles per hour (130 km/h) were reached, the fourth train, which was fitted with control equipment by Metropolitan Vickers, was built with flat ends and conventional cabs, an appearance that was carried forwards to the 1938 Stock. The two-car units were fitted with Wedglock couplers at the outer ends, which were a development of the Tomlinson coupler, and joined the units mechanically, pneumatically and electrically. One unit of the first train was fitted with air conditioning and fixed windows, but this was removed and opening windows were installed, as any failure of the system resulted in the car overheating in tunnels, causing discomfort for passengers.

By increasing the number of notches on the speed controller, and fitting more motors, acceleration of the new trains was around 2 mph (3.2 km/h) per second, an increase from 1.2 mph (1.9 km/h) per second on the Standard Stock. Braking rates were also improved to 3 mph (4.8 km/h) per second by fitting each brake block with its own cylinder, and using a retardation controller to control the brake pressure. This allowed higher pressure to be applied at faster speeds, and the pressure to reduce as the speed dropped, to maintain a constant rate of deceleration without wheel slip.

=== Delivery ===
The first three two-car units were delivered to Lillie Bridge Depot in October and November 1936. From there, they were transferred to Ealing Common depot, where staff from the various companies supplying the equipment completed installation and arranged acceptance tests. Most of the two-car units were tested and accepted individually, but the units with Metropolitan Vickers equipment ran as four cars. Testing took place on the test tracks which run between Acton Town and Northfields, with the first taking place on 13 November 1936. Testing continued on most weekdays until 8 January 1937. A Press day was held at Northfields depot on 17 November 1936, and the "streamlined wonders" received widespread coverage in national newspapers.

Prior to the production of the 1935 Stock, driving motor cars were designated as 'A' cars if they faced west, and 'B' cars if they faced east. However, for the new stock, the axles were lettered from 'A' to 'D', and the driving motor cars were lettered according to the nearest axle. They were thus designated as 'A' cars in they faced west and 'D' cars if they faced east, a scheme which has been carried forwards to all subsequent stock.

=== Operation ===
The first train to enter passenger carrying service did so on 8 April 1937 on the Piccadilly Line, and the final one followed nearly a year later, on 10 March 1938. Initially, they ran as four-car trains during the daytime, avoiding the morning and evening peak services. From 26 April 1937, an extra two-car unit was added to the four-car trains at the end of the afternoon service, and the six-car formation ran through the evening peak. Four cars of flat-fronted stock began running from 24 January 1938, but cars 10009, 11009, 10010 and 11010 were transferred to Golders Green depot on the Northern Line on 31 March 1938, so that gauging tests for the 1938 Stock could be carried out. They returned to the Piccadilly Line on 4 July 1938.

The various types of streamlined units were used interchangeably to make up four-car and six-car trains, but the flat-fronted units were kept together. There were significant teething problems with the new equipment, and when the outbreak of World War II made maintenance difficult, the trains were put into storage at Cockfosters depot. Three of the cars found temporary use as air raid precaution (ARP) shelters, one at Northfields depot, and two at Cockfosters. They were parked over a pit and surrounded by sandbags, for use in an emergency. They found no further use in service until the end of 1948, when there were plans to remove the streamlining and drivers cabs from the streamlined cars, and for them to become trailer cars which would run in 1938 Stock trains. Work began on the first conversion in early 1950, and was quite extensive. In addition to the rebuilding of the bodywork, all of the traction equipment was removed, and a complete rewire of the electrical system was needed. When the work was completed, the trailers looked similar to the 1938 Stock, but there were some visible differences. The converted cars only had three windows between the single end door and the first set of double doors, whereas the 1938 Stock had four, and the single door itself was further from the end of the car. Trailer number 012484 was outshopped in August 1950, and entered service on the Northern Line in September. It was monitored to see how it performed, and the remaining 17 conversions incorporated changes to the doors and bogies as a result. The motor cars became trailers 012477 to 012494, and the last one to be used in passenger service was number 012489, which was withdrawn in 1976.

In 1949, the flat-fronted units were modified to run as two-car shuttle trains, and were to be transferred to the Central Line. Some of the streamlined cars had been through an overhaul process, where the bogies had been upgraded to conform to 1938 Stock standards. As the flat-fronted units had not received an overhaul, they were given bogies removed from the updated streamlined cars. The Wedglock couplers at the outer ends were removed and replaced by Ward couplers, so that they could be mechanically coupled to Standard Stock trains, and air hoses were fitted. The Metropolitan Vickers control system was removed, and replaced with the British Thomson-Houston equipment, which had been removed when those units were converted to trailers. The guard's control panel, which had been located in the cab, was moved to the trailing end of the 'D' cars, so that the guard remained in the same position whichever the direction of travel. To ensure that each train ran with two compressors, KLL4-type compressors were fitted to all of the cars.

By August 1950, conversion of the shuttles had been completed. Two units entered passenger service in October, with the final one following in February 1951. Central Line services had been extended from Loughton to Epping on 25 September 1949, and the converted trains were primarily used to provide a shuttle service on this section, although they were sometimes used on the Woodford to Hainault section, which had opened on 21 November 1948. The three trains were moved back to the Piccadilly Line on 17 May 1954, for use on the shuttle service from Holborn to Aldwych. Car 11010 overran Aldwych station on 3 April 1955, and was damaged when it hit the buffer stops. The cab was rebuilt at Acton Works, and the finished result looked more like the 1938 Stock than the remaining 1935 Stock cars. Two trains returned to the Central Line for the opening of the Epping to Ongar service on 18 November 1957, where they were assisted by a three-car unit of 1938 Stock, specially adapted by fitting two compressors to the trailer car.

The third unit, consisting of cars 10011 and 11011, had been moved to Ealing Common depot in early 1957, to be used in a trial of regenerative braking. The concept, which involves the motors being used as generators, and current being fed back into the system for use by other trains, had been tried previously, on the O and P surface stock trains, which were equipped with metadyne controllers. The metadyne controllers were being replaced at the time, as they were proving increasingly unreliable, but London Underground still hoped that the system could be used to reduce energy costs. The 1935 Stock train was fitted with regenerative braking equipment manufactured by British Thomson-Houston, and the substation at Northfields was adapted to cope with the regenerated current. Because it was a trial system, the equipment was installed in the passenger area, and a self-lapping switch was fitted to the brake controller, which tilted as the brakes were applied. Testing of the system ran from May 1957 to early 1958, when a system manufactured by General Electric Co replaced it, and a third set of tests used equipment by Metropolitan Vickers. Although regenerative braking did not become part of the 1959 Stock or 1962 Stock production runs, the British Thomson-Houston equipment was modified to allow tests of rheostatic braking on a test train of 1960 Stock, which paved the way for it to be incorporated into the 1967 Stock built for the newly constructed Victoria Line.

=== Demise ===
The unit used for regenerative testing was returned to passenger service in May 1960, and rejoined the other two units on the Epping to Ongar shuttle. It was fitted with a modified 1927 Stock trailer, as the other two units had been previously, to provide more passenger accommodation. Once the Central Line had been re-equipped with unpainted aluminium 1962 Stock, the red livery of the 1935 Stock looked incongruous, and they were painted silver between August 1963 and May 1965. The trailer cars were fitted with de-icing equipment in 1964, and the units continued to be used on the Epping to Ongar route, until they were withdrawn from passenger service in 1966, when 1962 Stock replaced them. The units, including the 1927 trailers, were stored at Hainault depot for a time, and then moved to a scrap line at Ruislip depot.

When London Underground were considering the use of articulated trains on the Northern Line, to replace the 1938 Stock, the redundant 1935 Stock was used for trials. Motor cars 10010 and 11010 spent some time at Acton Works for preliminary tests, and were then returned to the Ruislip scrap line. On 15 May 1969, motor cars 10011 and 11011 entered Acton Works for full-scale trials to be conducted. The trailing ends of the cars were cut back so that only one window remained beyond the rear doors. The driving end bogies were replaced by new lightweight aluminium ones, while the trailing ends of both cars were supported by a single steel bogie. The conversion work was completed for testing to begin in August 1970, and information was collected for a year. There were plans to re-equip the Northern Line with 8-car articulated trains, but rolling stock requirements were reassessed when authorisation to build the Heathrow extension of the Piccadilly Line was obtained, and the idea of articulated trains was dropped in favour of using conventional 1972 Stock, similar to that running on the Victoria Line. Following the tests, the articulated unit was found to be particularly useful for shunting, as the beams carrying the current collecting shoes were 64 feet (20 m) apart, enabling it to cross long gaps in the current rails at low speeds. It was given a maroon livery, and renumbered L14A and L14B, becoming part of the service fleet. The aluminium bogies were removed for further testing on a 1972 Stock car in 1975, and the 1935 cars were scrapped at Acton in early 1975. The units on the Ruislip scrap line lasted until they were officially scrapped on 10 October 1971.

== Numbers ==
The 1935 stock consisted only of Driving Motor (DMs) cars. The number series was continued for the DMs of the 1938 Stock

'A' DM	'D' DM	Electrical equipment	Notes
10000	11000	Crompton Parkinson	
10001	11001	Crompton Parkinson	
10002	11002	General Electric Co	
10003	11003	British Thomson-Houston	
10004	11004	General Electric Co	
10005	11005	Crompton Parkinson	
10006	11006	General Electric Co	
10007	11007	British Thomson-Houston	
10008	11008	British Thomson-Houston	
10009	11009	Metropolitan Vickers	Ran with 1927 trailer 70511
10010	11010	Metropolitan Vickers	Ran with 1927 trailer 70512
10011	11011	Metropolitan Vickers	Ran with 1927 trailer 70510

== Trailers ==
It had originally been planned that three trailer cars would be inserted into the three streamlined units, to lengthen them from six- to seven-car units. These would have been similar to 1938 stock trailers except that they had no compressors. After the war these three cars instead became part of the 1938 Stock and were numbered 012412 - 012414, being fitted with compressors.
