= Ruislip Depot =

London Underground traction maintenance depot on the Central line

Ruislip depot
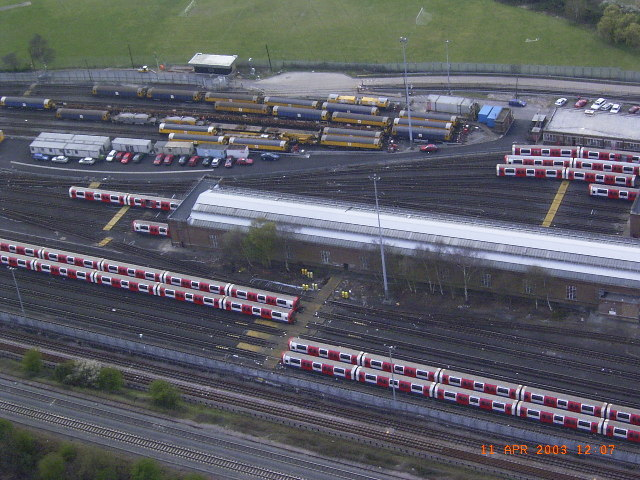
- The London end of Ruislip depot, showing the train cleaning shed in the centre. 1992 Stock is stabled on the sidings, and departmental stock is stabled at the top left.
- Interactive map of Ruislip depot

Location
- Location: Hillingdon, United Kingdom
- Coordinates: 51.564°N 0.425°W

Characteristics
- Owner: London Underground
- Type: Tube stock

History
- Opened: 1948

Ruislip depot is a London Underground traction maintenance depot on the Central line, and is situated between the stations of Ruislip Gardens and West Ruislip in the London Borough of Hillingdon. The depot is accessible from both ends, and was built for the Central Line extensions under the 1935-1940 New Works Programme. It was nearly completed by 1939, when the outbreak of the Second World War prevented further work. It was used as a factory for anti-aircraft guns during the war, and was finally opened in 1948. The main car shed has 16 tracks, and there is also a three-track car cleaning shed.

In 1969, a flash butt welding facility was constructed at the depot, to enable welded rails up to 600 feet (180 m) long to be produced. At a similar time, extra sidings were installed on land to the south of the original buildings, one of which provides a link to the Piccadilly Line and Metropolitan Line tracks to Uxbridge. Since Automatic Train Protection and Automatic Train Operation systems were installed on the Central Line, the depot has also hosted a unit of 1960 Stock which is privately owned by Cravens Heritage Trains.

Part of the depot was retrofitted with a green roof in 2012, as a trial for a larger-scale rollout across London Underground. The scheme was monitored by the University of East London.

== History ==
Following its formation in 1933, the London Passenger Transport Board introduced a five-year New Works Programme, due to run from 1935 to 1940. A major part of this was extensions to the Central Line, both in the east, to Leytonstone, Woodford, Epping and Ongar, and in the west from North Acton Junction to Ruislip. The western extension would run along new tracks laid beside the Great Western Railway main line to Birmingham Snow Hill. The extensions, which would create a route mileage of 45 miles (72 km), meant that new depots would be required for the extra trains needed, and they were to be located at Hainault and Ruislip. Work began, but none of the Central Line extensions were completed before the outbreak of the Second World War.

The Great Western Railway near Ruislip runs in a south-east to north-west direction, and the depot was to be built to the west of the existing railway and the new Central Line tracks. However, the land there was at a low level, and in order to raise it up, some 220,000 cubic yards (170,000 m^{3}) of chalk infill was delivered by rail and spread over the area. The project saw widespread use of mechanical appliances, both in the spreading of the infill and in the excavation of trenches and foundations. A surface drainage system was installed over the whole site, and the chalk was covered with a 12-inch (30 cm) layer of ash. The main car shed was designed with 16 tracks, each with an inspection pit, to facilitate maintenance of the trains. The pits were 440 feet (130 m) long, and had earthenware drains, which fed water into 6-inch (15 cm) pipes, laid between adjacent tracks. The clay beneath the site contained sulphates, and consequently much of the drainage system, including some 900 yards (820 m) of 18-inch (46 cm) and 24-inch (61 cm) pipes, was constructed of spun-concrete sections, made with aluminous cement.

The depot was nearly finished by 1939, but with completion of the whole project delayed by the war, it was used as a factory, making anti-aircraft guns, and was also used to store spare and withdrawn rolling stock. Once hostilities had ended, work resumed on the western extension, much of which was constructed on bridges and viaducts, to carry it over a succession of roads, railways and canals. The work was carried out by the Great Western Railway, but after the nationalisation of the railways in 1948, responsibility for the line was gradually transferred to London Transport, a process that was finally completed in 1963. The depot, which opened in 1948, has connections to the running lines at both ends, and was initially designed for the stabling of 150 cars, but with provision for it to be extended to stable 350 cars. The main car shed is 941 feet (287 m) long, and 16 tracks enter it at the north-western end, where it is 241 feet (73 m) wide. Nine of the tracks are only covered for about half of its length, after which the building narrows, and the tracks funnel down into three, to enter the car cleaning shed, which is 450 feet (140 m) long and 58 feet (18 m) wide. A single-storey building with a flat roof, which is used for offices, stores and a repair shop, runs along the south-western wall of the main building. In the 1970s, there were some 6 miles (9.7 km) of tracks forming the approach lines, and another 2.5 miles (4.0 km) of track within the depot. The buildings are separated from the running lines by seven sidings, used for stabling trains in the open.

=== Rail welding plant ===
London Transport was the pioneer user of welded rail in the United Kingdom, having bought their first flash butt welder in 1937 and installed it at Lillie Bridge Depot. This enabled them to produce welded rails for their own system, and also, until 1947, for British Railways. As access from Lillie Bridge to Northumberland Park was not possible, a new welding machine was bought from the Swiss company H A Schlatter in 1964, and installed at Northumberland Park to produce the rails for the Victoria Line, then under construction. The depot at Lillie Bridge was cramped, and in 1969 London Transport decide to build a fully automated plant at Ruislip for flash butt welding of long rails. They already owned land to the south-west of the main car sheds, and there was sufficient room to allow 600-foot (180 m) rails to be produced. The site had the advantage that there was easy access for trains delivering the 60-foot (18 m) lengths of rail to be used in the process, and trains carrying the finished product could reach all parts of the system via the Central Line.

Rails, which are regularly produced in lengths from 60 feet (18 m) to 300 feet (91 m), to accommodate the location of track signalling circuits, can be of six different sections, depending on where they are to be installed and whether they are running rails or conductor rails. Incoming rails are handled by a 5-tonne overhead crane, and stacked in preparation for welding. A separate cutting and drilling machine prepares the ends of the rails, which are then dry shot-blasted to clean them as they pass along a conveyor to the welding machine. The Schlatter welding machine, which was moved from Northumberland Park when the plant was constructed, uses a single-phase electrical supply at 14 volts and 40,000 amps. When the temperature of the rail ends reaches 1350°C, they are forced together with a hammer-blow action and a force of 32 tons to complete the welding process. Any irregularities in the rail are removed by a rail straightening press, after which the rails are stored in a stacking ground or loaded directly onto a long rail train.

There are three additional sidings to the south-west of the welding plant, and one of them provides access to the Metropolitan Line and Piccadilly Line tracks between Uxbridge and Rayners Lane, via a trailing crossover track. These were installed around the time that the welding plant was constructed, as they are not shown on the Ordnance Survey map of 1962 but are shown on the 1968-1974 map. Both maps show the depot exit tracks at the West Ruislip end continuing over the Piccadilly and Metropolitan tracks to enter RAF West Ruislip, a Royal Air Force depot.

=== Operation ===
Although the depot was new in 1948, and the Central Line had been extended at both ends, the rolling stock was not new. 1,121 cars of 1938 Stock were purchased under the 1935/40 New Works Programme, but these were used to re-equip the Northern Line and most of the Bakerloo Line. The Standard Stock trains that were displaced were upgraded, and used to run the extended service on the Central Line. Thus the first trains to be stabled at Ruislip were composed of Standard Stock, mainly formed into seven-car trains, although there were a limited number of eight-car trains, as the shorter trains did not have sufficient capacity for peak services. Purchase of the 1949 Stock allowed more Central Line trains to be lengthened with displaced trailer cars, and all trains stabled at Ruislip were of eight cars by September 1960, when delivery of 1959 Stock started, replacing the Standard Stock used on the Piccadilly Line.

After 19 trains of 1959 Stock had been delivered to the Piccadilly Line, maintenance issues with the Standard Stock resulted in subsequent trains being diverted to the Central Line. As the Central Line needed eight-car trains, London Transport ordered an additional 57 non-driving motor cars, one to be delivered with each seven-car train, and Ruislip, together with Hainault, became the first depots to receive 1962 Stock cars, as the extra cars were officially of that type. 1962 Stock was subsequently used to re-equip the entire Central Line, and a total of 676 cars, including the 57 non-driving motor cars, were ordered to form 84.5 eight-car trains. The last of the 1959 Stock trains left Ruislip for the Piccadilly Line after delivery of the 1962 Stock was completed on 17 May 1964.

Ruislip remained a bastion of 1962 Stock until delivery of 1992 Stock began. A total of 85 eight-car trains were ordered, and the individual cars were of four distinct types. These were formed into two-car units in three combinations, and allowing for the fact that all units are fully reversible, an eight-car train can be made up in 36 possible ways. The first train entered service on 7 April 1993, and by 20 February 1995, all service trains stabled at Ruislip were 1992 Stock. An additional 20 cars of 1992 Stock were purchased for the Waterloo and City Line, then operated by Network SouthEast, and were delivered to Ruislip depot in three batches during March 1993. The trains were commissioned at Ruislip, prior to test running, and were transferred by road from the depot to Waterloo in May and June 1993.

=== Delivery and despatch ===
In addition to rolling stock used on the Central Line, the depot has also seen other classes of trains. In 1949, 91 new cars were ordered, to allow the reorganisation of the 1938 Stock then running on the Bakerloo Line, the Northern Line and the Piccadilly Line. 20 of these were trailer cars, but the other 71 were non-driving motor cars, the design of which was new. They were known as uncoupling non-driving motor cars, and were fitted with an automatic Wedglock coupler, with a shunting controller mounted in the end bulkhead. They generally formed the inner end of a three-car unit, and were coupled to a normal driving motor car on a four-car unit. Because of delays in the delivery of some of the equipment needed to fit out the new cars, many of them were delivered to Ruislip depot, and then moved to Ealing Common, where the motors were fitted and commissioning took place. After commissioning, they were stored at Hammersmith until they were required.

All of the 1967 Stock for the opening of the Victoria Line was delivered to Ruislip from Metropolitan-Cammell at Birmingham. The work of preparing the trains for service was undertaken at the depot, and once ready, they were moved to Hainault for testing of the Automatic Train Operation equipment on the Woodford to Hainault section of the line. They were then moved to Northumberland Park by battery locomotives via a link to Eastern Region tracks at Leytonstone. Once the first part of the Victoria Line was open, trains were moved from Ruislip to the line via the Piccadilly Line and a crossover at Finsbury Park.

When the 1938 Stock was reaching the end of its life, new stock was ordered for the Northern Line. It was originally intended that this would be formed of 8-car articulated units, with the ends of two cars carried on a single bogie, but rolling stock requirements were reassessed when authorisation to build the Heathrow extension of the Piccadilly Line was obtained. The articulated concept was dropped, and 1972 Stock was ordered, which was similar to the 1967 Stock, but designed for operation by a crew of two. In addition, the trains were reversible, so that traversing the Kennington Loop would not cause operational difficulties. The new trains, which were designated 1972 Mark I Stock, were delivered to Ruislip depot for commissioning, before being transferred to the Northern Line.

Some of the 1995 Stock, ordered from GEC Alsthom Metro Cammell for the Northern Line, was also delivered to the depot. The first train arrived on 20 December 1996, but there were commissioning issues, and the second train did not arrive until April 1997. The issues resulted in 26 trains of 1995 Stock being moved to MoD Kineton for storage, and eight trains were delivered new to Kineton, finally arriving at Ruislip for commissioning in Autumn 1999, once the technical issues had been resolved.

Six cars of London Underground 1935 Stock, a trial batch of trains to test out features incorporated into the 1938 Stock, had been built with flat ends, rather than streamlined ends, and following their final withdrawal from passenger service in 1966, had been stored at Hainault depot. They were subsequently moved to Ruislip, from where two cars moved on to Acton Works on 15 May 1969, for testing of articulated couplings. In their latter days, the two-car units of 1935 Stock had been lengthened by the addition of a converted trailer dating from 1927, and the three trailers were also stored at Ruislip. The four driving motor cars and three 1927 trailers remained at the depot until 10 October 1971, when they were cut up and officially scrapped.

=== Ecology ===
In 2012, some of the depot buildings were covered with a green roof, as part of an assessment to see if rainfall could be attenuated, and thus relieve drainage problems. Two separate areas were selected, which were isolated from one another, so that runoff from the roofs could be monitored. Runoff from a standard roof was also measured, to give a comparison. The plant material used consists of sedums supplemented by annual and perennial wildflowers. The scheme was monitored by the University of East London, and was partially funded by the Greater London Authority, who paid for the monitoring element of the experiment. Initial observations showed a significant increase in populations of insects such as bumblebees and ladybirds. If the benefits in terms of waterproofing and drainage control are significant, the project will act as the prototype for a larger-scale installation..

== Preservation ==
In addition to the operational stock for the Central Line, a train of privately owned stock is based at the depot. Cravens Heritage Trains bought a 3-car train of 1960 stock, and this was stabled at Hainault following its use as the final train on the Epping to Ongar branch. A series of rail tours were run on the eastern end of the Central Line during 1995 and 1996, but it was moved to Ruislip depot in 1996, when the Central Line signalling was upgraded for Automatic Train Protection and Automatic Train Operation, which meant that the preserved unit could no longer operate on the Central Line, as it was not compatible with the new system. Subsequent railtours normally started from Uxbridge, easily reached from Ruislip via the connection to the Piccadilly Line tracks beyond the welding plant. The unit had been delivered to Ruislip in August 1960 when new.

The depot was also the location at which 1938 Stock was assembled before its sale to British Rail, for use on the Isle of Wight. 34 cars left the depot in Autumn 1988, en route for the engineering works at Eastleigh, where they were refurbished for use on the Island Line.
