= London Underground 1960 Stock =

Class of train rolling stock

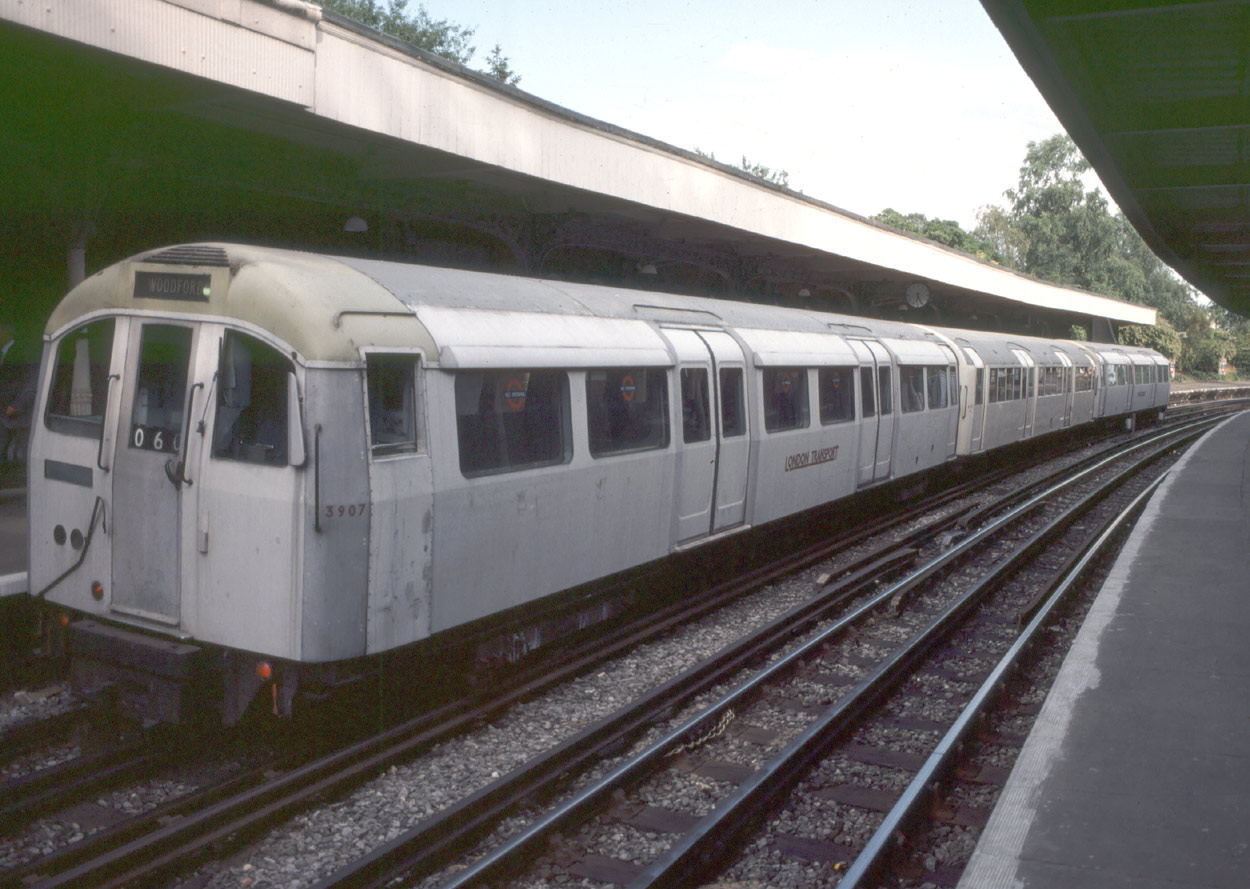
- Two 1960 motor cars with a 1938 trailer at Grange Hill station
- Stock type: Deep-level tube
- In service: 1960–1994
- Manufacturer: Cravens

Specifications
- Car length: 52 ft 0 3/8 in (15.86 m)
- Width: 8 ft 6 1/4 in (2.597 m)
- Height: 9 ft 5 1/2 in (2.883 m)
- Weight: 26.89 long tons (27.32 t; 30.12 short tons)
- Seating: 40 per car

The London Underground 1960 Stock was a class of electric multiple unit for the London Underground Central line. Twelve motor cars were supplied by Cravens, and pairs were made up to four cars by the addition of two converted standard stock trailers. A production run of 338 motor cars was shelved, due to the time needed to assess the new features and the cost of converting the trailer cars. Some of the pre-1938 trailers were later replaced by 1938 stock trailers.

The trains were used as a test-bed for automatic train operation, where control signals were picked up from the running rails, and all control of the moving train, apart from the initial command to start when leaving a station, was managed by a "black box" controller. The Woodford to Hainault section of the Central line was used for these tests, in preparation for the introduction of the system on the Victoria line when it opened. In 1986, three trains were converted back for manual operation, and a 3-car unit worked the peak-only Epping to Ongar shuttle service, until that line closed on 30 September 1994. One train still works as a track recording unit, while a second is in private ownership and has been used for railtours on the Underground.

== Background ==
London Underground has a history of building small batches of prototype trains in order to try out ideas, prior to building a large production run of new trains. Thus in 1935, four six-car trains were supplied by Metropolitan Cammell Carriage and Wagon Company, which were used as a test-bed for ideas which would be incorporated into the later 1938 stock, while in 1986, three trains, each of four cars and built by different manufacturers, were ordered with subsequent larger orders in mind. The 1960 stock was part of a similar solution, and consisted of twelve motor cars, built by Cravens of Sheffield, incorporating a number of features which it was anticipated would form the basis for a major batch of vehicles to replace the pre-1938 stock then in use on the Central line. If the plan had proceeded, a further 338 motor cars would have been built. However, assessment of the new features took longer than the time available, and the Central line refurbishment was achieved using 1962 stock, which was based on the previous batch of 1959 stock. Many of the design features of the 1960 stock were eventually incorporated into the 1967 stock built for the opening of the Victoria line.

== Driving Motor cars ==
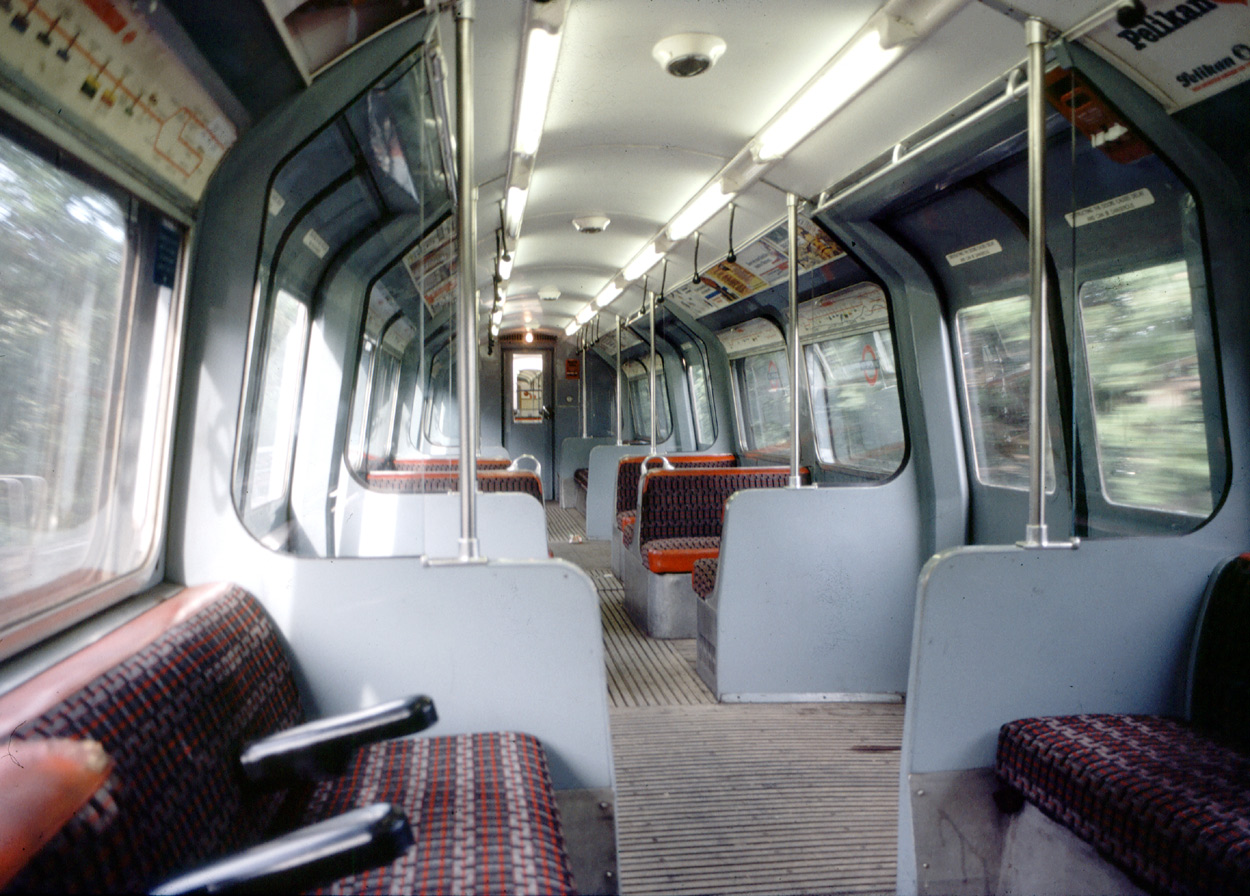
Inside 1960 tube stock Driving Motor car.

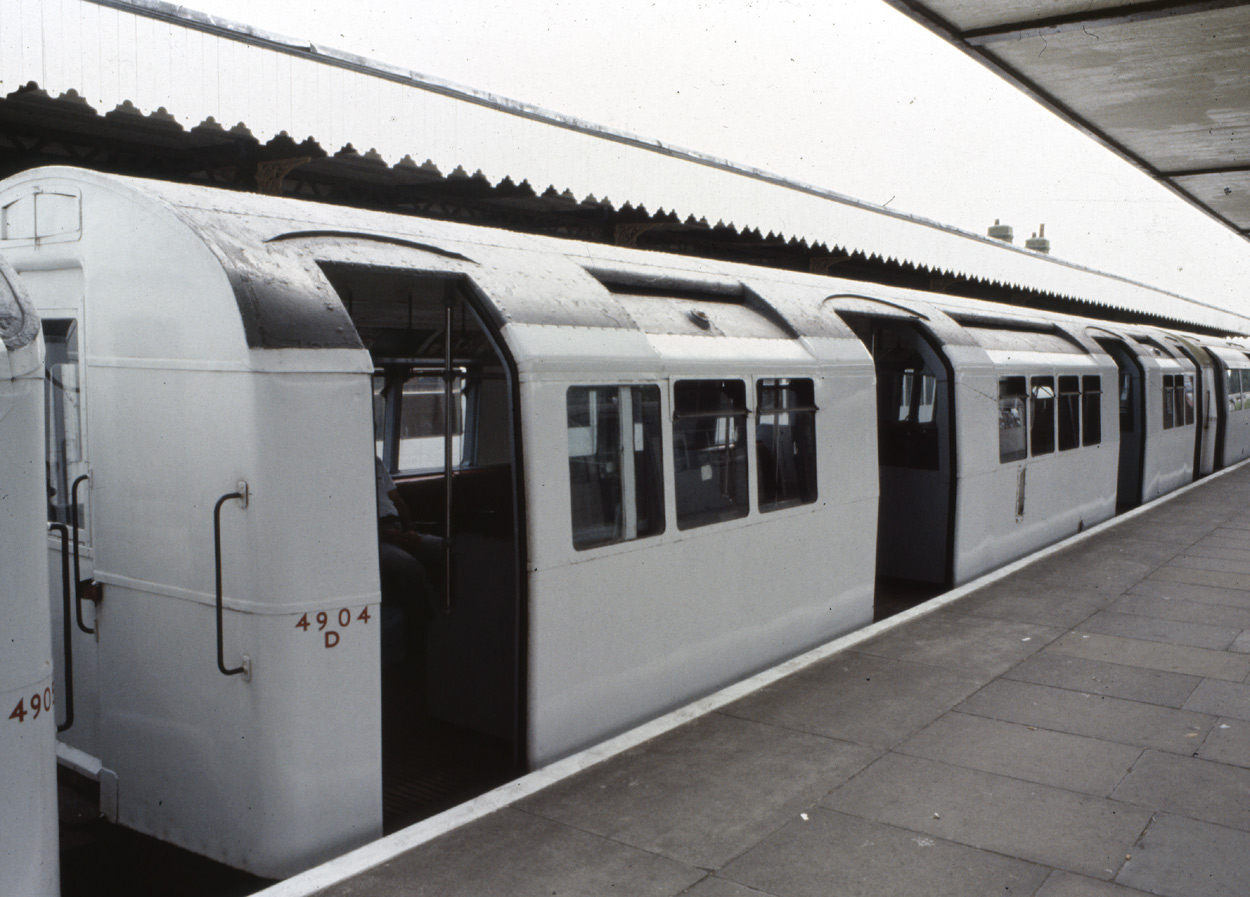
1960 tube stock trailer at Hainault station. The D signifies that it was fitted with de-icer equipment for use during the winter.

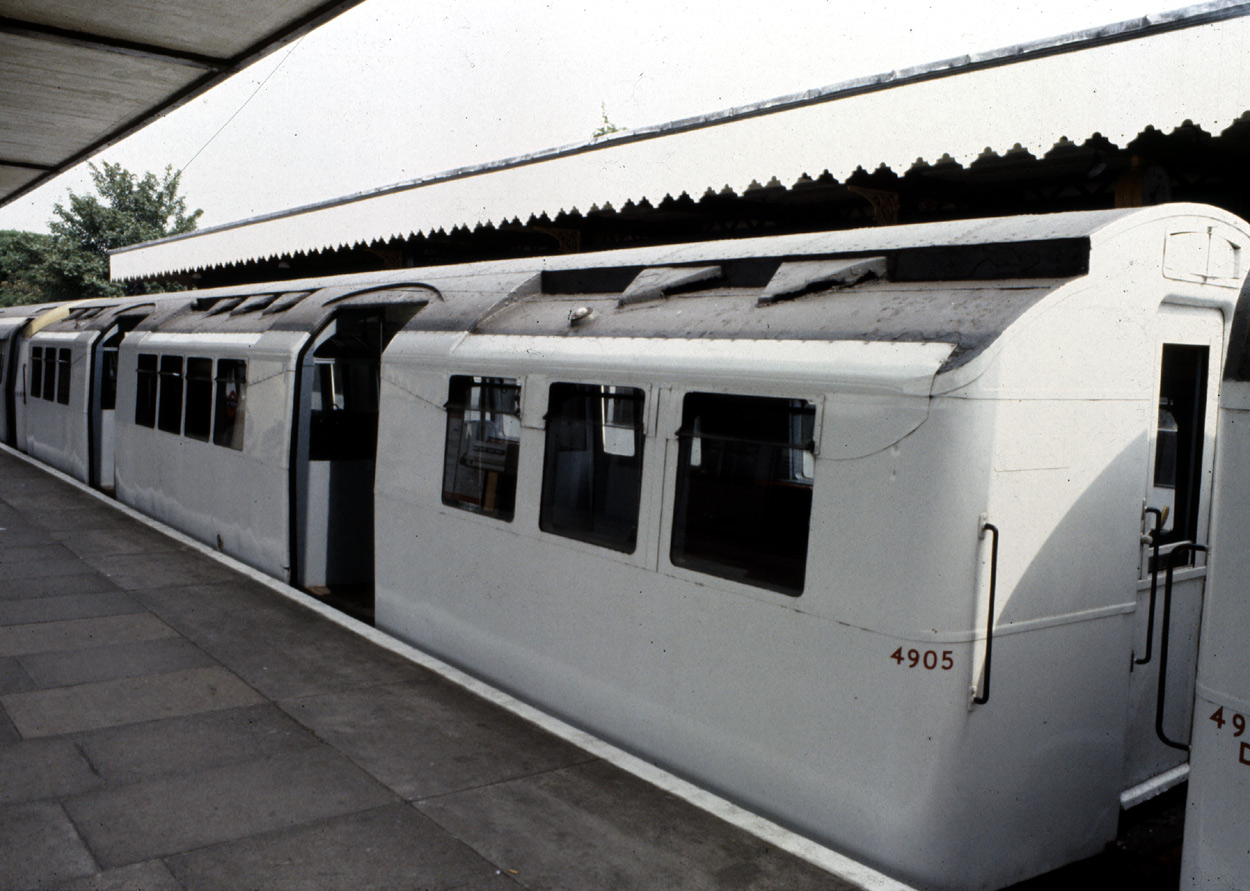
1960 tube stock trailer at Hainault station. This is one of the two cars built with no end doors.

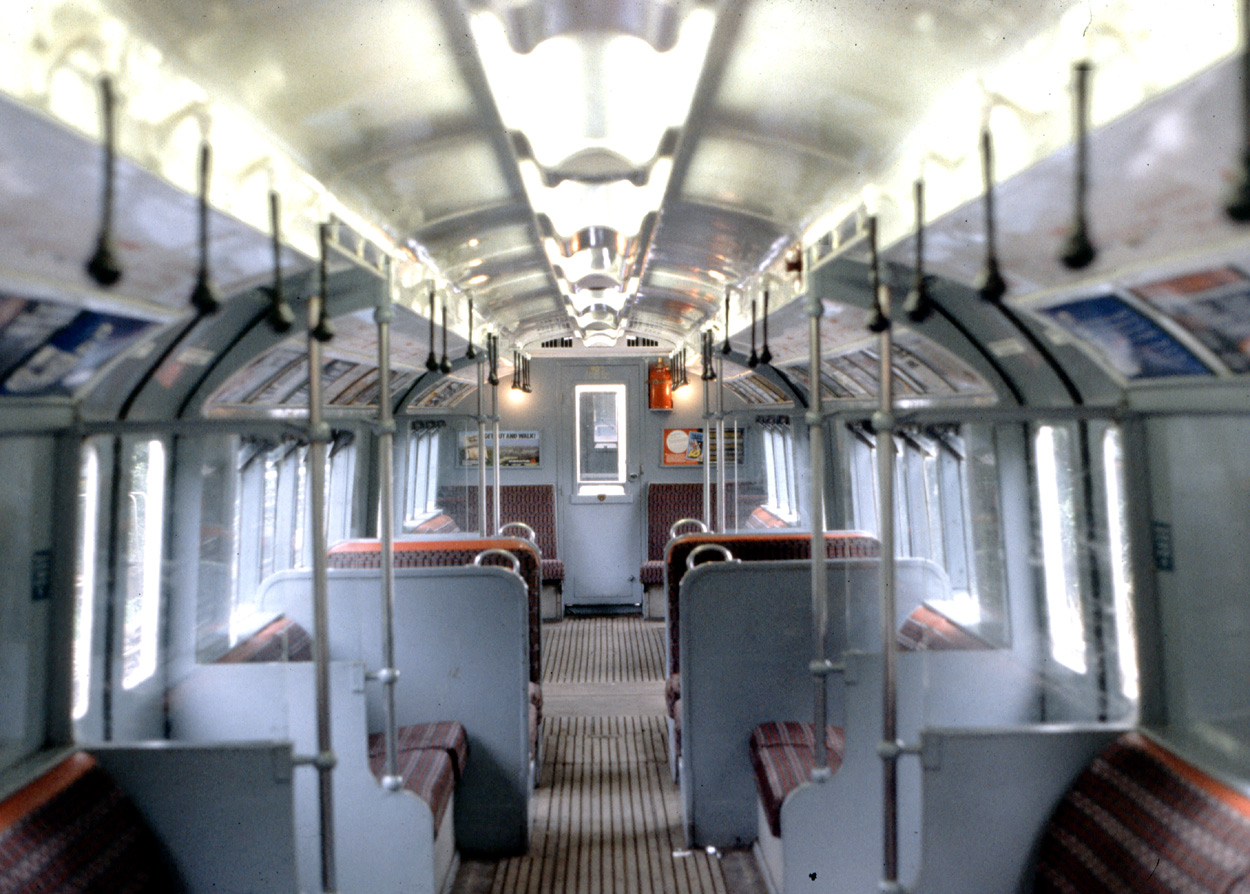
Inside 1960 tube stock trailer No. 4905.

The twelve aluminium-bodied motor cars were ordered from Cravens in 1958, and each was equipped with four traction motors, instead of the two which previous stock had used. They were controlled by a Pneumatic Camshaft Motor (PCM) controller, where an air-operated camshaft controlled the switching of the motors, which was itself governed by an accelerating relay. This system had proved reliable in the control of two motors. In order for it to control four, without a major re-design, pairs of motors were wired together in series, and the controller switched between all four motors operating in series, and the two pairs operating in parallel. In order to protect against wheel-spin, the controller automatically reset if one motor of a pair began to run faster than the other. Whereas previous bogies had been asymmetric, to ensure that more weight was carried by the axle driven by the motor, the pivot was central as every axle carried a motor. One further innovation was that the fully automatic couplers at the outer ends of the trains were not "handed". Previously, trains were designated with 'A' and 'D' ends, and could only be coupled together by joining an 'A' end of one train to a 'D' end of another. This could cause operational problems, particularly on a line such as the Central, where operating a train right round the Hainault loop resulted in it facing the wrong way. The 1960 stock avoided this problem by duplicating most of the connections in the automatic coupler, so that trains could be joined either way round. The cars also included a flat floor for the first time, rather than having a raised section over the motor bogies (previous stock had flat floors at the centre section only, with a rising transition in the two double doorways to a steeply curved floor 4 inches higher at either end over the bogies).

The first of the new trains entered service on 9 November 1960. The driving motor cars were numbered 3900-3911 although the first two cars, built by Cravens, were numbered 3000 and 3001, being renumbered 3900 and 3901 before entering service. To make the sets up to four cars, each incorporated two trailer cars which were rebuilt from old Pre-1938 Standard Stock. Two units were intended to be coupled together, forming an eight-car train. The 1960 Stock initially ran on the main Central line, before being cascaded to the Hainault Loop. One of the main factors influencing the use of 1962 stock for the Central line upgrade, rather than a production run of 1960 stock, was the cost of refurbishing the Standard Stock cars to run with the new driving motor cars.

== Trailer cars ==
Initially the 1960 stock cars were coupled to two refurbished "Standard Stock" trailers, numbered 4900–4911. Originally the cars were to have been numbered starting at 4000. Conversion work included the fitting of fluorescent lighting, the addition of door indicator lights to the outside of the cars, and painting in silver paint, to match the unpainted aluminium of the motor cars. Four of the trailers had been built in 1927, and only included two sets of double central doors. Two of these were rebuilt with additional single doors at each end. The rest of the trailers were built in 1931, and included the extra single doors when built. Four of these trailers were later fitted with de-icing gear, and carried a 'D' below the running number to indicate this. By 1974, the trailers were a serious maintenance problem, and a decision was taken to replace them with single 1938 Stock cars coupled between the two motor cars, reducing the units from four to three cars. Conversion work included the fitting of two compressors, as the pre-1938 trailers had been equipped with one each, but the process was costly, and only three sets were completed.

The pre-1938 trailer cars were withdrawn between 1975 and 1983, and the converted 1938 trailers that entered revenue earning service were numbered 4921, 4927, and 4929. The process was delayed by the discovery of asbestos in some of the motor cars. Two further four-car trains were refurbished in 1980 and 1981 at Hainault depot. One visible difference was that the trailers were painted white, rather than silver. The sixth train was by this time used for track recording. A 1938 trailer was converted for use with it and renumbered TRC912, but was never used. It remained in store until 2006, when it was scrapped by CF Booth, Rotherham.

== Automatic Train Operation ==
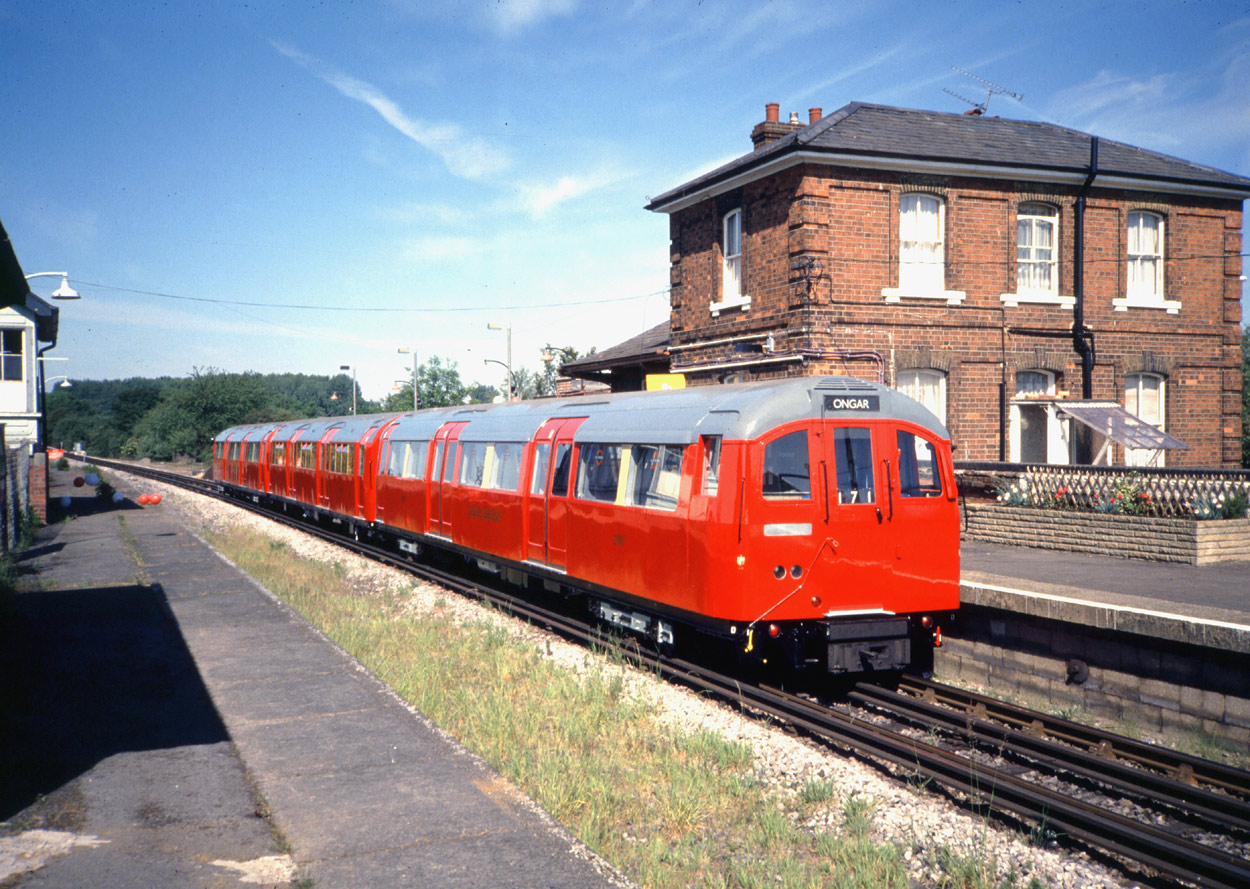
Red 1960 stock train heading for Ongar calls at North Weald, 1990. This train comprises 2x 1960 DM and 1x 1938 T.

The 1960 Stock trains ran mainly on the Hainault loop. Following limited trials on the District line of a system of Automatic Train Operation (ATO) in 1963, the lightly used Woodford to Hainault section of the Central line was used as a testing ground for full ATO in preparation for its use on the Victoria line. Five of the six 1960-stock trains were adapted at Acton Works. The side doors to the driver's cab were sealed, so that access was normally through the passenger saloon. Since the trains were to be operated by one person, the door controls were moved from the rear end of the motor car into the cab. The train control equipment was fitted beneath the centre seats, and consisted of a "black box", which interpreted signals received from the running rails. These were picked up by sensing coils mounted on the leading bogie. One rail supplied safety information, which was received continuously. Any failure to obtain this data resulted in a trip-valve operating, which stopped the train. The second rail supplied signal commands, which included speed signals and instructions to start and stop the train. This information was only provided when it was needed. The driver was renamed a train operator, and was responsible for opening and closing the doors at stations, and initiating a start from the stations, by pressing two buttons simultaneously. All other operation, including stopping at signals and restarting when safe to proceed was automatic. The first automatic train entered service on 5 April 1964. The automatic control equipment was temporarily mounted in the passenger saloon, between the cab and the first set of doors, to enable engineers to monitor and adjust it as experience was gained.

== Demise ==
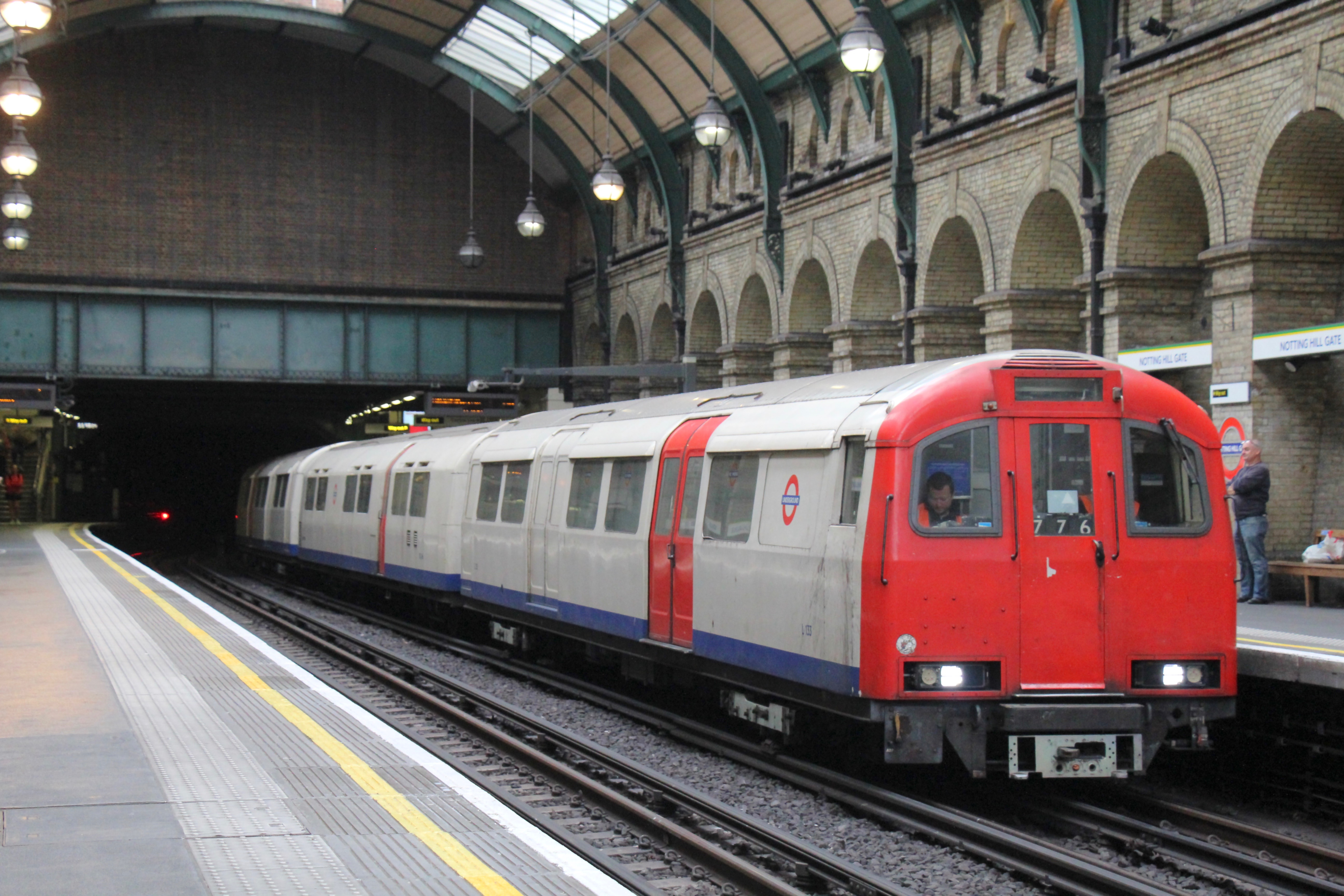
The Track Recording Train formed of 1960 Stock Driving Motors and a 1973 Stock trailer, passing Notting Hill Gate on routine track measurement on the District Line.

One unit was used to trial a system of fully automatic train control on the Woodford to Hainault branch in the early 1980s. The original ATO equipment had reached the end of its life by 1986, and three trains were converted for manual one-person operation. In the 1990s, one of these 3-car trains operated the peak-only Epping to Ongar shuttle service. The 1960 stock was withdrawn when that line closed on 30 September 1994.

One of the 1960 Stock trains was retained by LUL and remained in use as track recording train, running with 1973 Stock trailer TRC666. It was overhauled at Eastleigh Works in 2019. The original 1960 track recording cars were scrapped because of asbestos contamination, and two of the retired motor cars were converted to replace them. A second unit is owned by Cravens Heritage Trains. It is kept at Ruislip depot, and has been used for railtours and filming work since it was purchased in 1995.

DM	T	NDM	DM	Location
3907	4927	-	3906	LUL Northfields Depot (4927 actually 1938 Stock)
3911	-	-	-	Buckinghamshire Railway Centre (Cab Only)

Key
DM	Driving motor
T	Trailer
NDM	Non-driving motor

== Bibliography ==
- Bruce, J. Graeme (1968). Tube trains under London. London Transport Board. ISBN 0-85329-000-8.
- Bruce, J. Graeme (1988). The London Underground Tube Stock. Ian Allan Ltd. ISBN 0-7110-1707-7.
