= London Underground 1967 Stock =

Class of train rolling stock

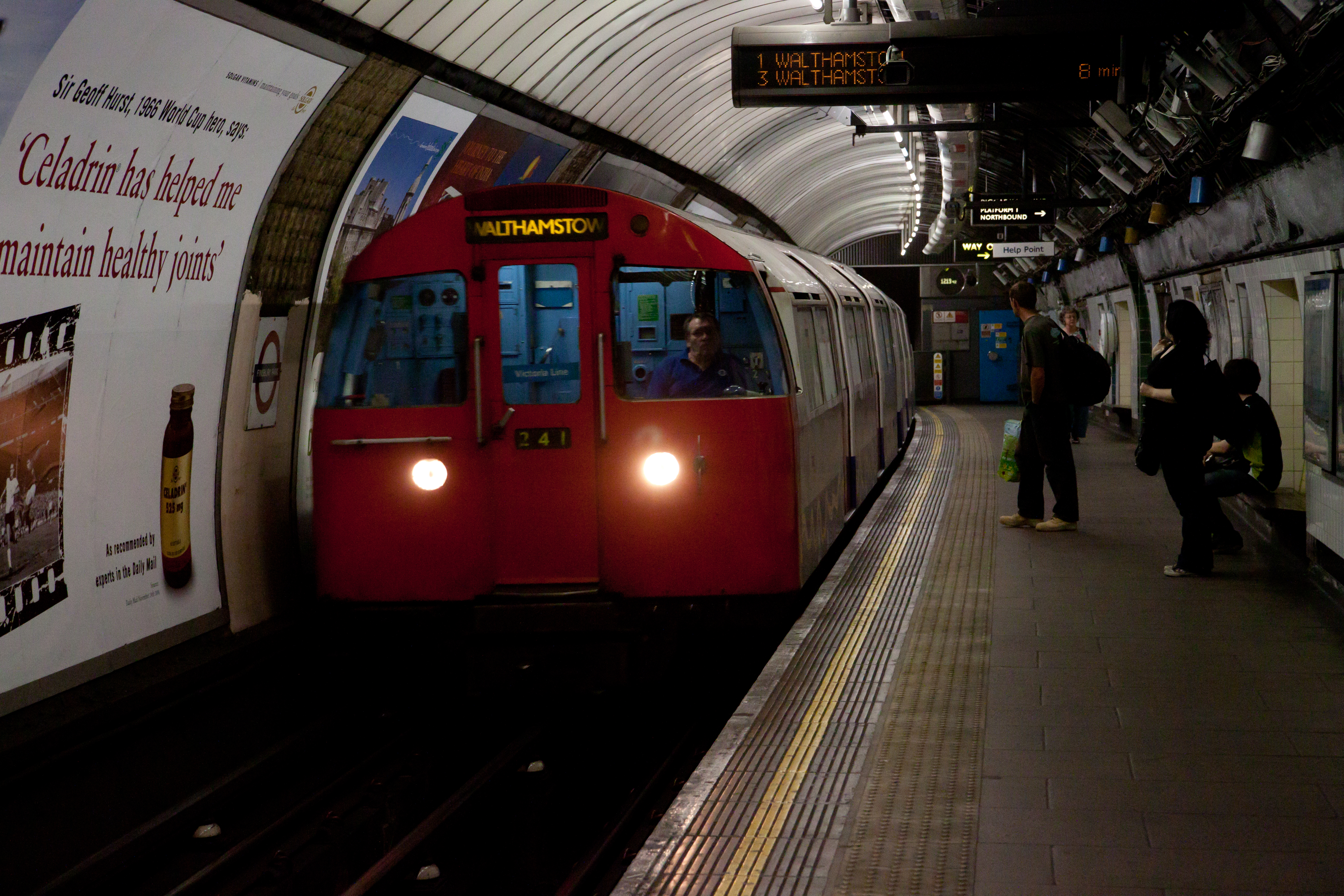
- 1967 Stock train at Finsbury Park in 2010

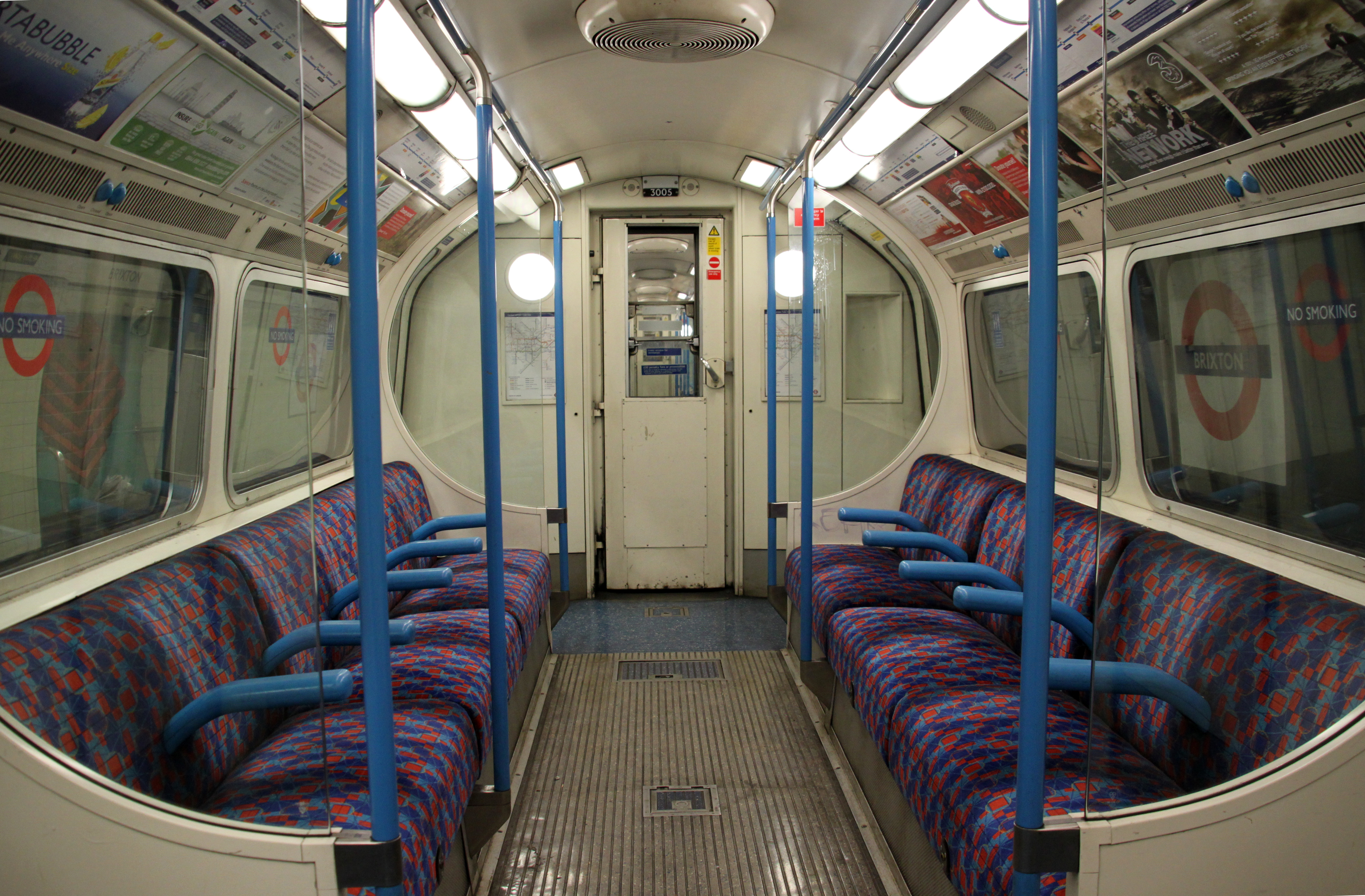
- The interior of a refurbished 1967 Stock car
- Stock type: Deep-level tube
- In service: 21 February 1968 – 30 June 2011
- Manufacturer: Metro-Cammell
- Built at: Birmingham, England
- Constructed: 1967–1969
- Refurbished: Tickford (at Rosyth Dockyard); 1989–1995
- Number built: 316 cars (original); 31 cars (converted from 1972 Mk I stock)
- Successor: 2009 Stock
- Formation: 4 cars per unit, 2 units per train
- Capacity: DM: 40 per car; T: 36 per car
- Depot: Northumberland Park
- Lines served: Victoria line Central line (Hainault - Woodford 1968–1984)

Specifications
- Car length: DM: 16.08 m (52 ft 9 in); T: 15.98 m (52 ft 5 in)
- Width: 2.642 m (8 ft 8.0 in)
- Height: 2.877 m (9 ft 5.3 in)
- Maximum speed: 80 km/h (50 mph)
- Weight: DM: 28.5 tonnes (28.0 long tons; 31.4 short tons); T: 19.4 tonnes (19.1 long tons; 21.4 short tons)
- Traction system: Pneumatic single camshaft (Associated Electrical Industries)
- Traction motors: LT115 DC motor (Crompton Parkinson/Brush Traction)
- Electric system: 630 V DC Fourth rail
- Current collection: Contact shoe
- Track gauge: 4 ft 8 1/2 in (1,435 mm) standard gauge

The London Underground 1967 Stock was a type of deep-level train that operated on the Victoria line of the London Underground from the line's opening on 1 September 1968 until 30 June 2011. It was also used on the Central line between Woodford and Hainault between 21 February 1968 and 1984, as the same automatic train operation (ATO) system was used on both lines.

316 cars (39.5 train sets) were built by Metro-Cammell, and subsequently refurbished at Rosyth. Withdrawn cars of Mk I 1972 Stock were later moved into the 1967 stock fleet in the 1990s, creating a fleet of forty-three 1967 stock trains. As they did not feature ATO, they were used only as non-driving cars, positioned in the middle of trains rather than at the ends. By the beginning of their retirement in 2010, the 1967 stock had achieved a mean distance between failures of over 14,000 km (8,700 mi).

Each complete train consisted of two four-car units coupled together. The operator started it by simultaneously pressing two buttons in the cab to initiate the automatic process. They were the first London Underground trains with wrap-around windows in the driving cabs.

The trains were maintained at Northumberland Park Depot.

== Background ==
London Transport had built a batch of 12 prototype motor cars, known as the 1960 stock, to test out a number of new features, and it was originally intended that these would form the basis for a production run to replace the ageing Standard Stock. However, tube usage was increasing, and with the Standard Stock proving unreliable in these new circumstances, the decision was taken to build the 1962 stock, which was essentially the same as the earlier 1959 stock. Metropolitan-Cammell, the manufacturer, built all three models on the same production line, without a break.

In August 1962, after years of lobbying by London Transport, the government authorised the construction of the Victoria line, a completely new 10.5-mile (16.9 km) underground line running from Walthamstow to Victoria. Designs for the line included high levels of automation, and this included Automatic Train Operation. Trials were carried out on the District line, and once it had been established that automatic train operation was feasible, a full-scale trial was run on the Woodford to Hainault section of the Central line. Five of the six trains of 1960 stock were modified, and automatic operation of the branch began on 5 April 1964. This enabled the system for the 1967 stock to be thoroughly tested, and early units of the stock were tested out on the branch.

== Design ==
The 1967 Stock was the first opportunity to build cars which included many of the enhancements tried out in the 1960 Stock. They were designed for the Victoria line, and each train consisted of eight cars, marshalled as two four-car units. Each unit had a driving motor car at both ends, and two trailer cars between them. The outer ends of the motor cars were fitted with Wedglock automatic couplers, and all cars in a unit were semi-permanently coupled together. It was not expected that units would be uncoupled in service, and the arrangement on previous stock where uncoupling required simultaneous operations to be performed in both cabs was replaced by one where uncoupling could be initiated in the first car and completed afterwards in the second.

The Victoria line was to be equipped for automatic operation, and the driver was replaced by a "train operator", with responsibility for shutting the doors, and then pressing two buttons simultaneously to start the train, after which the train would move under automatic control until the next station was reached. However, a single controller to allow the trains to be driven manually in the depot or in emergency while in service was provided. This incorporated both traction control and braking. Door controls were provided in the cabs, and a facility to isolate either of the two units from the leading cab was also included. For the first time on tube stock, all control circuits were switched by cam-operated micro-switches. They were used on the traction and brake controller, the disconnecting units, the fault isolating switches, the door controls and other control equipment, and resulted in a significant reduction in the routine electrical inspection needing to be carried out.

Rheostatic braking was used on the trains, and required amendments to the standard P.C.M. (Pneumatic Camshaft Motor) controllers, to include the switching in of the rheostats. When the train was to be stopped, rheostatic braking was used first, after which friction brakes on the trailer cars were brought into action. If required, friction brakes on the motor cars could also be used. The rheostatic braking fades as the speed drops below 10 miles per hour (16 km/h), and so slow speed braking was always by friction brake. As on the 1960 Stock, traction was supplied by four motors, one on each axle. The motors on each bogie were wired in series permanently, and the traction controller performed series/parallel switching of the pairs of motors. The handbrake used hydraulic power to apply it, and then remained locked on until hydraulic pressure was used to release it.

Window design followed the 1960 Stock, consisting of two large windows between each set of doors, giving a double-glazed appearance. The doors opened into the gap between the inner and outer skins. However, on the doors themselves, the windows were curved, so that the top was much higher than previous designs, allowing passengers to see station signs without stooping. Visibility for the driver was improved by the provision of wrap-around cab windows. Loading times at stations were improved by providing a stand-back beside the doors, so that passengers standing near the doors did not block so much of the exit. Lighting was by fluorescent tube, with two lights in each car fed from the battery through an invertor, so that they remained lit should the motor alternator shut down. Two types of motor alternator were used. Some were manufactured by AEI, and generated 230 V AC at 850 Hz, which was stepped down to 115 V for the lighting and 58 V for the battery charger. The alternative was manufactured by English Electric, and generated 60 V at 850 Hz, which was stepped up for the lighting.

The trains were the first in the system to be designed by an artistic designer (Professor Misha Black), rather than an engineer.

=== Delivery ===
When first opened, the Victoria line terminated at Victoria station. They were fitted with Automatic train operation (ATO) equipment, which had been tested on the Woodford to Hainault section of the Central line, using modified 1960 Stock trains. At first, trains were delivered to Ruislip Depot on the Central line. Following initial preparation for service, they were then transferred to Hainault Depot, where they ran as single units, so that the ATO equipment could be thoroughly tested. Once passed, they were taken to Leytonstone, from where battery locomotives were used to haul them over Eastern Region tracks to Northumberland Park Depot. After September 1968, when the first part of the Victoria line opened, trains were transferred from Ruislip to Northumberland Park directly, via a connecting link between the Piccadilly line and the Victoria line at Finsbury Park. Several four-car units were briefly transferred to operate the Woodford-Hainault service over the years, when the 1960 Stock units needed modification or overhaul.

The extension of the Victoria line to Brixton required additional trains, and a further 18 four-car units were built. These were identical to the original units, and the numbering scheme followed on from where the first batch ended. Increasing traffic levels on the Victoria line during the 1980s eventually required more trains, which posed a problem, since no other stock could operate on the line, because of the need for it to operate automatically. The 1972 Mk I Stock was similar, although it was built to run as seven-car trains, with a four-car unit much like the 1967 stock, and a three-car unit consisting of a driving motor car, a trailer car, and an uncoupling non-driving motor car, which was a motor car with no cab for the driver. Instead it was fitted with a shunting control cabinet at the outer end. The main differences between the 1967 and the 1972 stock was that the latter was designed for two-person operation, having door controls for the guard at the trailing end of the driving motor cars, and that it was reversible, as it had been ordered for the Northern line, where the Kennington Loop can result in either end of the train facing the north end of the line.

However, most of the equipment was compatible with the 1967 stock, and so some of the 1972 stock was modified to work on the Victoria line. Two seven-car trains would be split up, and the uncoupling non-driving motors would be discarded, providing three four-car units. From an eight-car train, the outer motor cars would be removed, and used to replace the inner motor cars of an eight-car train of 1967 stock, releasing two motor cars fitted with ATO equipment, which would then be fitted to the outer ends of the 1972 stock. The conversion work was carried out at Acton Works. Fourteen driving motor and fourteen trailer cars were added to the Victoria line stock by this method between 1987 and 1989, and a further two driving motor cars and one trailer were added between 1995 and 1999.

=== Automatic operation ===
The system of automatic train operation developed for the Victoria line, and hence the 1967 Stock, used two types of coded signals, which were fed into the running rails, and pickup up by two independent sets of coils on the train. The first was the safety signalling system, which used a continuous signal encoded at 125 Hz. This was used to pass codes at 420, 270 or 180 pulses per minute (ppm) to the control circuits. Failure to receive any of these codes resulted in the emergency brake operating. 180 ppm allowed the train to operate at speeds up to 25 miles per hour (40 km/h) but did not allow power to be applied if it had previously been shut off. 270 ppm allowed the train to operate up to the same speed, but power could also be re-applied if it had previously been shut off. Finally, 420 ppm allowed the train to run at the speeds set by the driving command system, which was the second of the two coded message systems.

The driving command system used short sections of the running rails, 10 feet (3.05 m) long, which were called 'spots', and carried signals coded at between 1 kHz and 20 kHz. Running speeds were coded so that 100 Hz represented 1 mile per hour (1.6 km/h), so a 3.5 kHz spot indicated that the train should be travelling at 35 miles per hour (56 km/h) and a 2 kHz spot that it should be travelling at 20 miles per hour (32 km/h). In addition, a 15 kHz spot indicated that the traction motors should be shut down, but the train allowed to coast, while a 20 kHz spot indicated that the train should stop, as the next signal was at danger. When a train passed a speed control spot on the approach to a station, the brakes were applied at different rates, depending on whether the train was travelling faster or slower than the specified speed. Once the speed was below 4 miles per hour (6.4 km/h), the brakes were released slightly, to ensure a smooth stop, and the resting position would be within 5 feet (1.5 m) of the desired stop point.

Braking spots were provided at 5-mile-per-hour (8.0 km/h) increments, from the expected maximum speed downwards, but if the train had been stopped at a signal by a 20 kHz spot, for instance, the actual speed on approaching the station would be much slower, and the outer spots would be ignored. Speed control was by an electronic governor and a frequency generator mounted on one of the traction motors, with an overriding mechanical governor, connected to one of the axles on the trailer cars. All trains were fitted with a fail-safe trip valve connected to the emergency brakes, and the mechanical governor operated this device if the speed exceeded 25 miles per hour (40 km/h) when the 420 code was not being received, if the speed exceeded 50 miles per hour (80 km/h) under any circumstances, or if the speed exceeded 11.5 miles per hour (18.5 km/h) when the train was being operated in 'slow manual' mode. The trains could be driven manually at speeds up to 25 miles per hour (40 km/h) if safety codes were still being received, or at 10 miles per hour (16 km/h) if no codes were being received, either because of a failure or because the train was in the depot, where the tracks were not coded.

=== Refurbishment ===
During 1989, all of the 43 8-car trains were taken to Acton Works, where they were fitted with passenger alarms, a public address system and other safety related features. The original hydraulic parking brakes were replaced by a new spring-operated brake. Following these changes, two units were selected for prototype refurbishment, which was undertaken by Tickford Rail of Rosyth Royal Dockyard and Vic Berry of Leicester. The work included replacement of the seats, lighting, panelling and grab rails. Externally, the cars were painted in a red, white and blue livery. The two units resumed service on 9 October 1989, and in June 1990, a rolling stock programme to update all of the cars was awarded to Tickford Rail. The work was completed in 1995.

== Roster ==
As delivered, the numbering system composed of the following:

		← Walthamstow Central (A) Brixton (D) →			
Formation		30xx (DM)	40xx (T)	41xx (T)	31xx (DM)
Numbers	1st Order	3001 : 3061	4001 : 4061	4101 : 4161	3101 : 3161
Numbers	2nd Order	3062 : 3086	4062 : 4086	4162 : 4186	3162 : 3186

- DM – Driving Motor car
- T – Trailer (non-powered) car

== Replacement ==
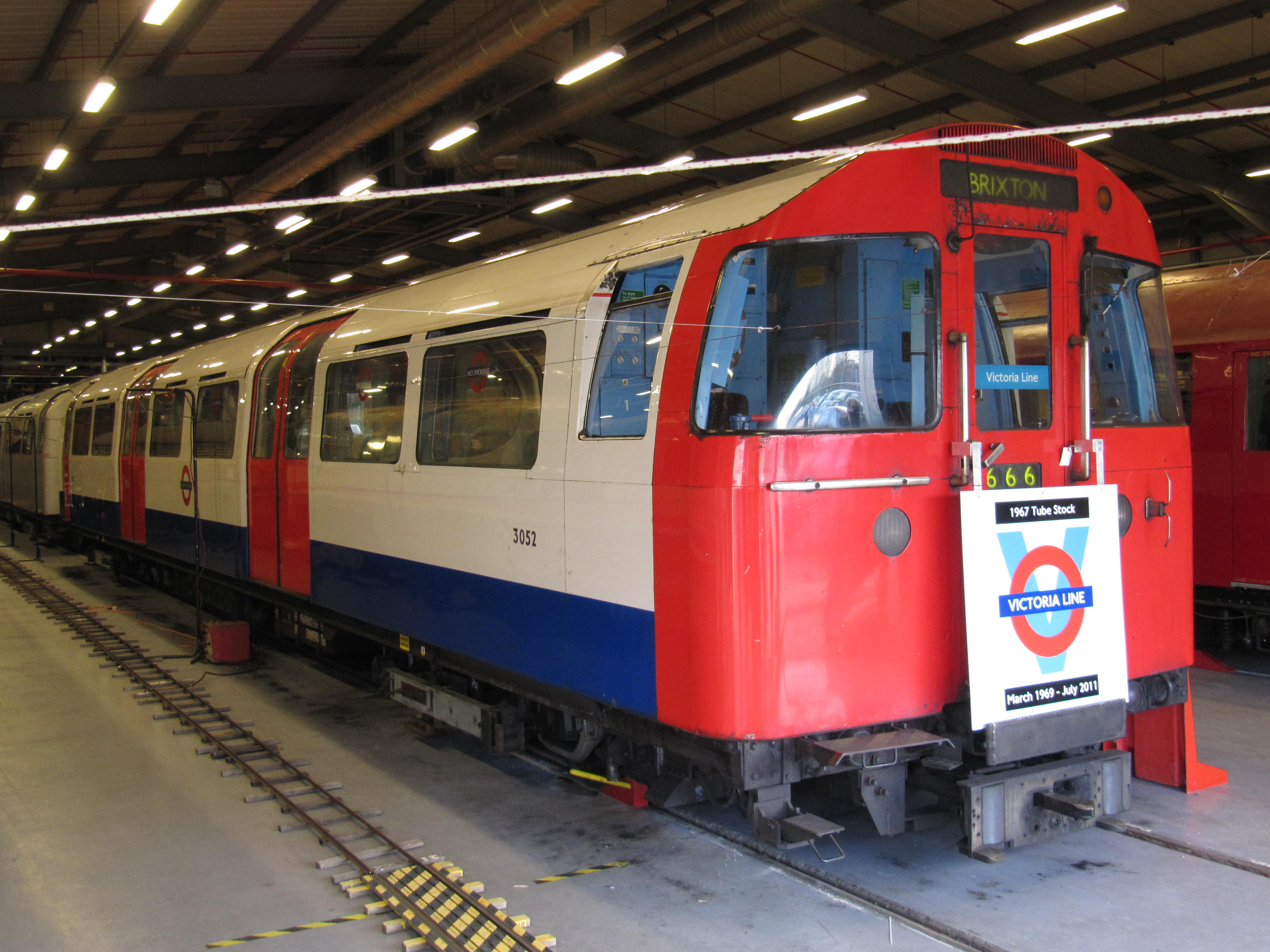
1967 Stock car 3052 at the London Transport Museum depot in Acton, wearing the commemorative board from the type's last day of service on the Victoria Line

The 1967 Stock was replaced by 2009 Stock, built by Bombardier Transportation as part of the Victoria line modernisation programme. The first prototype of the 2009 Stock was completed in 2007, and production trains were delivered from 2009 onwards. The first one entered service on 21 July 2009.

In January 2010, the first eight cars of 1967 Stock were moved to C F Booth of Rotherham to be scrapped. They had been used as a test train for several years.

After 27 May 2011, 1967 Stock trains were no longer able to run to stations north of Seven Sisters, because of the commissioning of a new, incompatible signalling system (and decommissioning of the old one) between there and Walthamstow Central. The last 1967 stock train from Walthamstow Central was formed of units 3075 and 3078, running as set number 246.

The last ever 1967 Stock train in passenger service on the remainder of the Victoria line (Brixton to Seven Sisters) ran on 30 June 2011. The last service departed Seven Sisters at 18:29, formed of cars 3159+4159+4059+3059 and 3179+4179+4079+3079, running as set number 247. After having reached Brixton, the train returned to Seven Sisters for the last time, arriving at approx 19:50. Due to delays caused by other factors, it ran around 20 minutes late on its last run.

Most cars were sent to C F Booth of Rotherham to be scrapped. However some units, particularly those which include 1972 Mk1 cars, have been placed into storage at Eastleigh works, possibly as spare cars for the Bakerloo line. Two driving motor cars from the last run, 3079 and 3179, have been incorporated into the Asset Inspection Train. In addition to this, one four-car unit, 3160, remained in Northumberland Park depot. It was used to shunt newly delivered trains of 2009 Stock, however now that these have all been delivered it has been moved. Another unit, 3067, is used to train cleaning personnel, and can move between various depots to facilitate this. It currently resides at London Road depot on the Bakerloo line.

== Post-withdrawal use ==
Car number(s)	Notes
3007+3107	Under conversion to form part of the Tunnel Cleaning Train.
3016	Part of passenger section on display at the Walthamstow Pump House Museum. This particular car suffered damage in an accident that led to it being taken out of service, hence its truncated state; interior has been restored to its original configuration
3022+3122	Under conversion to form part of the Tunnel Cleaning Train.
3049	Driving end at the Walthamstow Pump House Museum, used for filming purposes
3052	Preserved at the London Transport Museum's depot in Acton, London Borough of Ealing.
3079	Converted as part of the Asset Inspection Train.
4079	In storage at Eastleigh Works.
3110	Front end in storage at the London Transport Museum.
3161	Stored at Acton Works, and used for Emergency Response Unit training. This Driving Motor's destination blind, complete with its original enclosure, exists separately in a private collection.
3179	Converted as part of the Asset Inspection Train.
4179	In storage at Eastleigh Works.
3186	Static exhibit at the Walthamstow Pump House Museum, also used for filming purposes and as a restaurant.

=== Cultural preservation ===
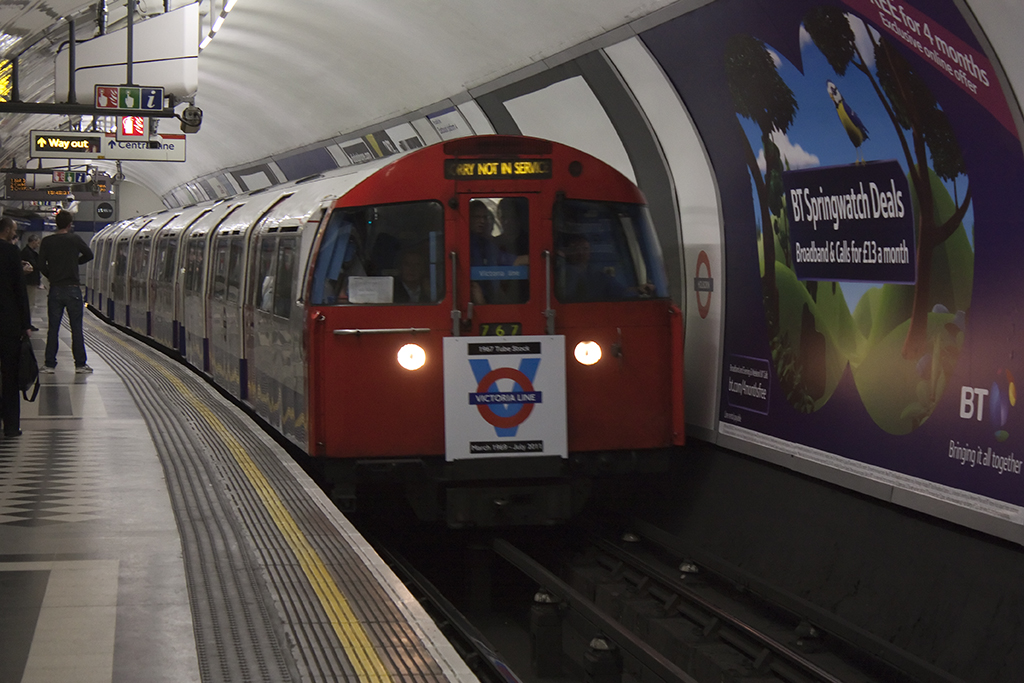
1967 tube stock at Holborn, during a rail tour.

A refurbished motor car in which Queen Elizabeth II travelled during the official opening of the line in 1969, number 3052, is preserved in a non-working condition in the London Transport Museum's Acton collection. It was withdrawn from service in October 2010. A damaged and unrefurbished driving motor, number 3016, was preserved at the Walthamstow Pump House Museum until the end of the site's lease in 2011, and was partly scrapped on site. Part of number 3016 was to be fully restored in time for the 150th anniversary of the London Underground, in 2013. However, refurbished driving motor car 3186 has now been preserved at the site, in experimental condition with a dark grey rather than white car end, and narrower transverse seating.

The 1967 stock was used as the tube train design for the Royal Mint's commemorative £2 coin designs of 2013 marking the 150th anniversary of the London Underground.

== Engineering use ==
Motor cars 3079 and 3179 are now part of the Asset Inspection Train, sandwiched between two cars of 1972 Stock on either side and without the wrap-around cab windows.

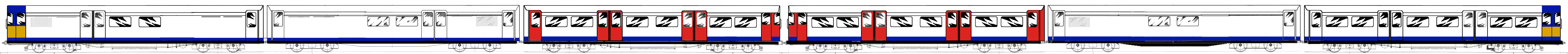

== Bibliography ==
- Bruce, J. Graeme (1968). Tube trains under London. London Transport Board.
- Bruce, J. Graeme (1988). The London Underground Tube Stock. Ian Allan. ISBN 0-7110-1707-7.
- Glover, John (1996). London's Underground (8th Ed). Ian Allan. ISBN 978-0-7110-2416-8.
- Green, Oliver (1987). The London Underground An Illustrated History. Ian Allan. ISBN 978-0-7110-1720-7.
- Hardy, Brian (1993). London Underground Rolling Stock (13th ed.). Harrow Weald: Capital Transport. ISBN 978-1-85414-164-4.
- Hardy, Brian (2002). London Underground Rolling Stock (15th ed.). Harrow Weald: Capital Transport. ISBN 1-85414-263-1.
- TfL (March 2007). "Rolling Stock Information Sheets (2nd Ed)" (PDF). Transport for London. Archived from the original (PDF) on 4 October 2013.
