= London Underground 1959 Stock =

Type of tube train

1959 Stock
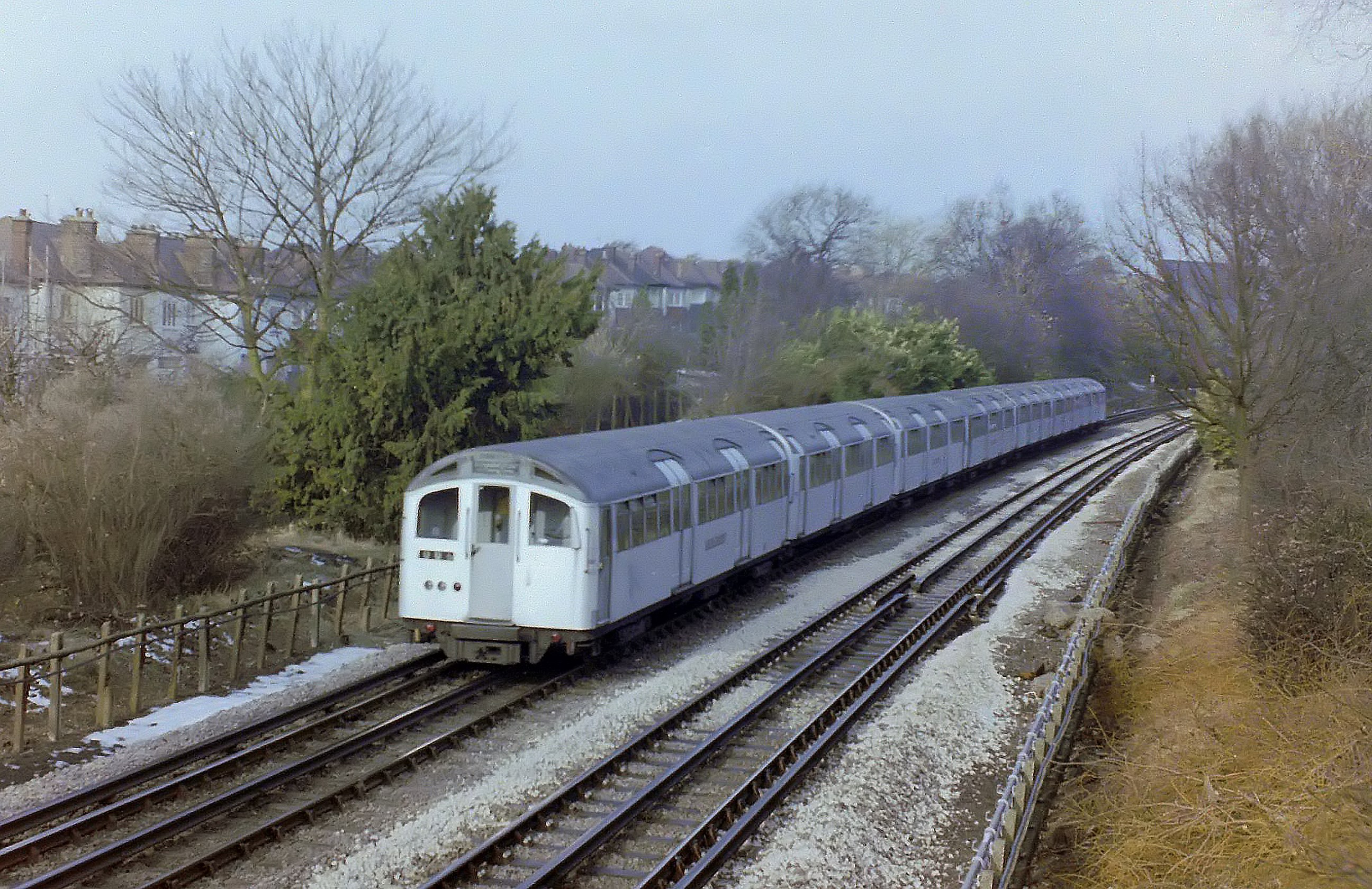
- A 1959 stock unit seen on the Northern line
- Stock type: Deep-level tube
- In service: 14 December 1959 – 27 January 2000
- Manufacturer: Metro-Cammell
- Replaced: 1938 Stock
- Constructed: 1959
- Lines served: Bakerloo line; Central line; Northern line; Piccadilly line

Specifications
- Car length: DM 52 ft 2 5/16 in (15.91 m); NDM 51 ft 2 13/16 in (15.62 m); T 51 ft 2 13/16 in (15.62 m)
- Width: 8 ft 6 1/4 in (2.597 m)
- Height: 9 ft 5 1/2 in (2.883 m)
- Weight: DM 26.62 long tons (27.05 t; 29.81 short tons); NDM 24.28 long tons (24.67 t; 27.19 short tons); T 20.67 long tons (21.00 t; 23.15 short tons)
- Seating: DM 42; NDM 40; T 40

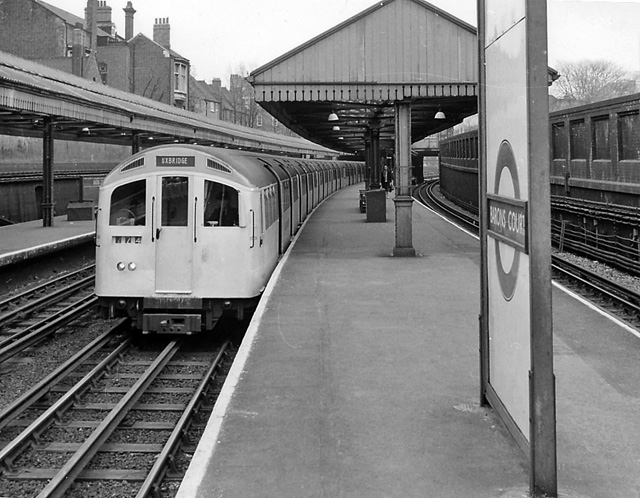
A 1959 Stock train at Barons Court in 1962

The 1959 Tube Stock was a type of London Underground tube train constructed in the late 1950s. They were intended for use on the Piccadilly line, but also saw use on several other tube lines. It was the first production tube stock to have unpainted aluminium alloy bodywork.

== Construction ==
The 1959 Stock was built by Metro-Cammell at the Washwood Heath Railway Works in Birmingham and were closely based on the prototype aluminium alloy bodied 1956 Stock. As with the 1956 stock, the Driving Motor (DM) cars seated 42, the Non-Driving Motor (NDM) and Trailer (T) cars both seated 40. Although early artists' impressions had shown a red stripe being painted along the train, and 'V' shape at the driving cab ends, the 1959 Stock were delivered in unpainted aluminium.

They were initially built for service on the Piccadilly line, where they first entered service on 14 December 1959, allowing both the 1956 and 1959 Stocks to cascade the newer types of "Standard stock" trains to the Central line, replacing the worst equivalents due to their unreliability. However, with not enough trains to cover the Standard Stock, together with the delayed construction of the 1960 Stock trains, 59 of the 76 ordered trains were first introduced on the Central line, entering service in July 1960. This was followed by an order of additional Trailer coaches to lengthen the trains to 8-car formations.

With the 1962 Stock being ordered as a follow-up design, their introduction allowed the 1959 Stocks to transfer back to the Piccadilly line as their intended routes, minus the additional trailer coaches which were transferred to the 1962 Stocks.

== Mid-life transfer ==
The Piccadilly line extension to Heathrow Central, which opened in 1977, coincided with the introduction of new 1973 Stock trains. Therefore, the 1959 Stock was transferred to the Northern line between 1975 and 1979, allowing the scrapping of the oldest 1938 Stock trains.

The 1959 Stock also saw service on the Bakerloo line between 1983 and 1989, again to facilitate withdrawal of 1938 Stock, before being replaced by the 1972 Mark 2 Stock from the Jubilee line following introduction of the 1983 Stock. Although never assigned to it, they were also known to have run occasional service on the Jubilee line during engineering works following the Stanmore branch's 1979 split from the Bakerloo.

In the aftermath of the King's Cross fire on 18 November 1987, the 1959 Stocks also had their sundeala boards and hardboard interior panels removed for aluminium panels, London Underground citing their wooden material posing as a fire risk.

== Replacement and preservation ==
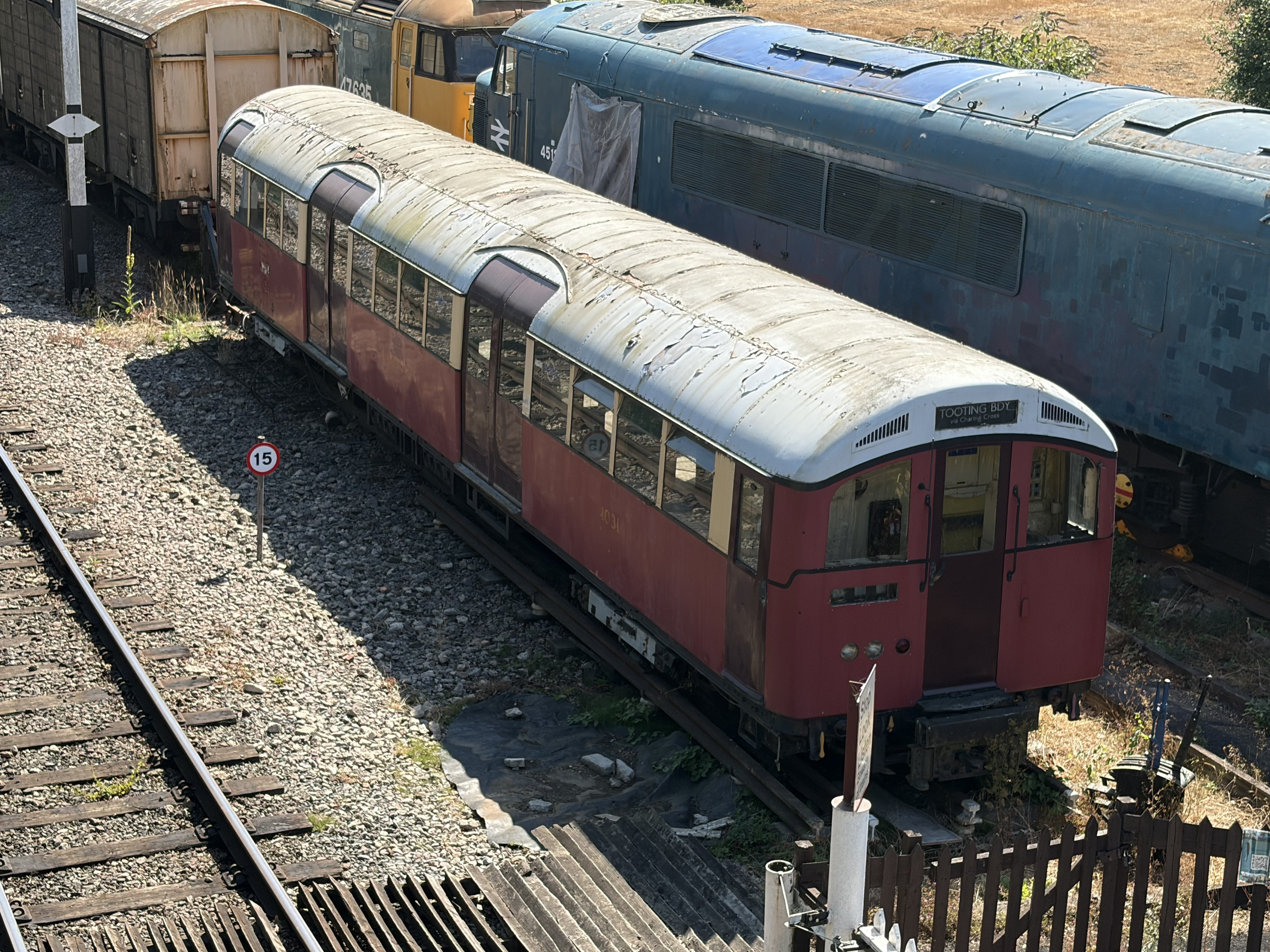
Preserved 1959 Stock DM car at the North Weald Depot

By the mid-1990s, the units had become worn and were in need of works attention. Despite a minor refurbishment taking place; which saw the blue/grey interiors painted white, replacing some of the seat moquettes while safety modifications and line identity schemes were retrofitted to the units; the failure rate had risen to 1 in 1,864 miles (3,000 kilometres).

106 new 1995 Stock trains, built by Alstom at the Washwood Heath factory, were ordered as replacements for both the 1959 and 1972 Stock trains also operating on the Northern line. Beginning in mid-1998, the 1959 Stock began to be withdrawn over the course of 15 months, decommissioning taking place at Ruislip or Morden depots and taken out of LU rails by rail or road respectively. The last example was withdrawn on 27 January 2000, the occasion marking the last remaining tube train to be crewed with a guard.

A seven-car unit was repainted in a "heritage" red and cream livery in 1990 to commemorate the line's 100th anniversary. Several cars of the heritage train were taken into preservation, including two Driving Motors now residing at the Alderney Railway in the Channel Islands. On 21 May 2018, one car of the heritage unit (DM car 1031) was delivered to North Weald on the Epping Ongar Railway with the intention of becoming a permanent display.

Only one trailer coach remains in active service, car 9125, forming part of the Central Line Sandite train, the rest of the train formed of 1962 Stock.

DM	T	NDM	DM	Location
1018	-	-	-	Privately owned, Motcombe, Dorset
-	2018	-	1304	Privately owned in the care of Southern Transit buses, Beeding, West Sussex
1030	2044	-	-	Mangapps Railway Museum
1031	-	-	-	Epping Ongar Railway
1044	-	-	1045	Alderney Railway
-	2304	9305	-	Privately owned in the care of Southern Transit buses, Beeding, West Sussex
-	-	-	1305	Sutton Hall Railway, Rochford, Essex
1306	-	-	-	Police Training School, Gravesend

Key
DM	Driving motor
T	Trailer
NDM	Non-driving motor

== Accidents and incidents ==
- On 14 December 1972, unit 1012 overran the stopping mark at Rayners Lane siding, colliding with the buffers and demolishing the eastbound signal immediately beyond.
- On 25 June 1973, a 1959 stock train leaving Uxbridge sidings and heading empty to Hillingdon, passed the siding's reception signal (which was at danger) and, with the points being set against the main line, ran into a bridge abutment.
- A 1959 stock train was derailed leaving Morden tube station for the Depot at 19:00 on 26 September 1978. In consequence, only one platform remained available at Morden for the reversing of trains for the rest of the day. The offending car (1243) was rerailed later that evening and the train was able to proceed into the depot.
- In the early hours of 19 February 1984, a 1959 Stock train stabled overnight in the southbound platform at Queen's Park ran away, eventually stopping just south of Regent's Park. Investigations later revealed only two of the four required handbrakes (of which one was defective) were applied.
