= London Underground 1956 Stock =

Prototype electric multiple unit of the London Underground

1956 Stock
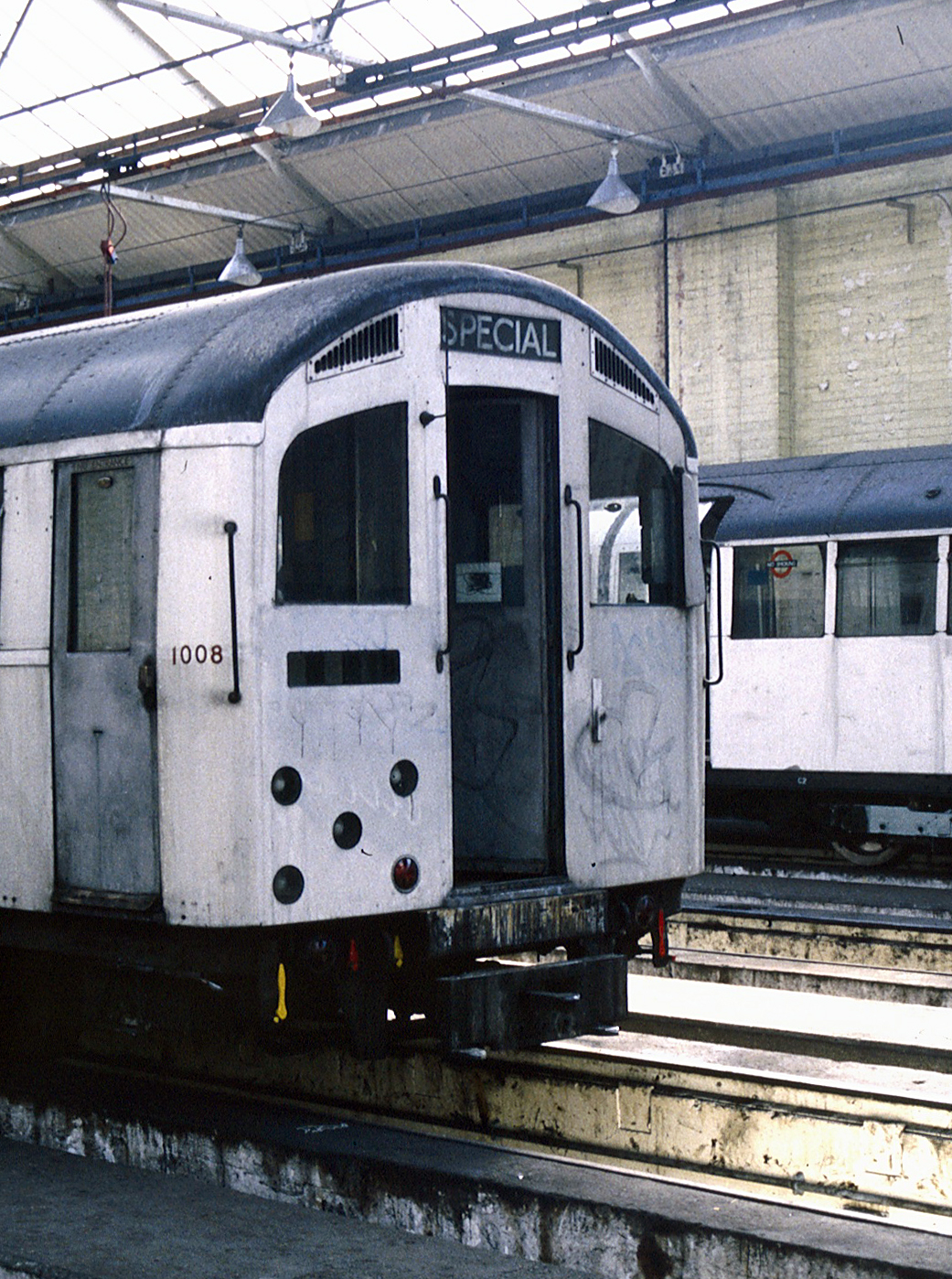
- 1008 at Golders Green in 1988
- Stock type: Deep-level tube
- In service: 1957–1995
- Manufacturer: BRC&W; GRC&W; Metro-Cammell

Specifications
- Car length: DM 52 ft 2 5/16 in (15.91 m); NDM 51 ft 2 13/16 in (15.62 m); T 51 ft 2 13/16 in (15.62 m)
- Width: 8 ft 6 1/4 in (2.597 m)
- Height: 9 ft 5 1/2 in (2.883 m)
- Weight: DM 26.48 long tons (26.90 t; 29.66 short tons); NDM 23.61 long tons (23.99 t; 26.44 short tons); T 20.56 long tons (20.89 t; 23.03 short tons)
- Seating: DM 42; NDM 40; T 40

The London Underground 1956 Stock consisted of three prototype units built before the mass production of the 1959 tube stock. These units were tested on the Piccadilly line and remained in service after production trains were introduced. Later, they were transferred to the Northern line, but in 1995, they were replaced as non-standard by 1962 Stock cascaded from the Central line.

== Background ==
The introduction of the 1938 Stock released considerable numbers of Standard Stock trains, which were scheduled to make up the shortfall on the Central line resulting from the line extensions. However, this process was interrupted by the Second World War, and although much of the Standard Stock had been through Acton Works for refurbishment, it was stored, as the opening of the extensions was delayed. Further refurbishment was carried out as the extensions opened between 1946 and 1949, but the stock proved to be unreliable after such a long period of storage. With the Piccadilly line also needing more trains, a plan for new rolling stock was formulated in 1948.

The plans were for 100 trains, each of seven cars. The British Transport Commission approved the project "in principle" in 1950, and a design contract was awarded to Metro-Cammell. A mock-up of a car body was constructed at Acton Works, and included some features which had been tried out on individual cars of 1938 stock, including some circular windows, and others that ran up above the roof line, to give passengers better visibility at stations. It was initially called 1951 Stock and then 1952 Stock when the programme was delayed. Bodywork would be of aluminium, rather than steel, but the official drawings showed that they would still be painted red. However, experiments with unpainted aluminium R Stock were taking place on the District line at the time. The high cost of building the trains and a decline in passenger numbers resulted in the plans being shelved in September 1952. When the situation was re-assessed in 1954, the London Underground decided to build three seven-car trains incorporating new ideas, and these became the 1956 Stock. They became available in 1957, and a production run followed in 1959. The unpainted exterior was adopted for the prototype 1956 stock and production 1959 / 1962 stock, and the interiors were given a blue and grey colour scheme to match.

== Design ==
Three seven-car trains of 1956 stock were built, each train by a different manufacturer. The companies involved were Birmingham RC&W, Gloucester RC&W and Metro-Cammell, although the units supplied were of near-identical external appearance and fitted with the same equipment. Each company provided a three-car and a four-car unit, the three-car unit consisting of a trailer car with a driving motor car at both ends, and the four-car units being of similar formation, but with an additional non-driving motor car in the rake.

While they were similar in many respects to the 1938 stock, the main differences were that the body panels were unpainted aluminium, rather than painted steel; a rubber suspension system was used on the bogies, reducing the number of parts that required regular maintenance; and the lighting was provided by fluorescent tubes, rather than incandescent bulbs. The front ends were flatter above the roof line, as the destination blind was fitted over the front cab door, rather than below the cab window. Control was provided by a PCM (Pneumatic Cam Motor) controller, supplied by Associated Electrical Industries, which had proven to be reliable in the 1938 stock. As with the 1938 stock, the DM cars seated 42 (but were not equipped with tip-up seats), while the NDM and T cars seated 40 each.

The outer ends of the trains were not fitted with fully automatic couplers, so that in an emergency, two trains could be coupled together mechanically, but not electrically. Once the 1959 stock was delivered, the couplings were modified to allow the two builds to work together. The electro-pneumatic brake was of a similar design to the 1938 stock, but the motor generator set was rather different, as it needed to supply alternating current at 110 V and 850 Hz. The design was influenced by problems with the fluorescent lighting supply on the sub-surface R stock, which tended to generate a loud magnetic hum. The frequency was chosen to ensure that it could not interfere with lineside signalling.

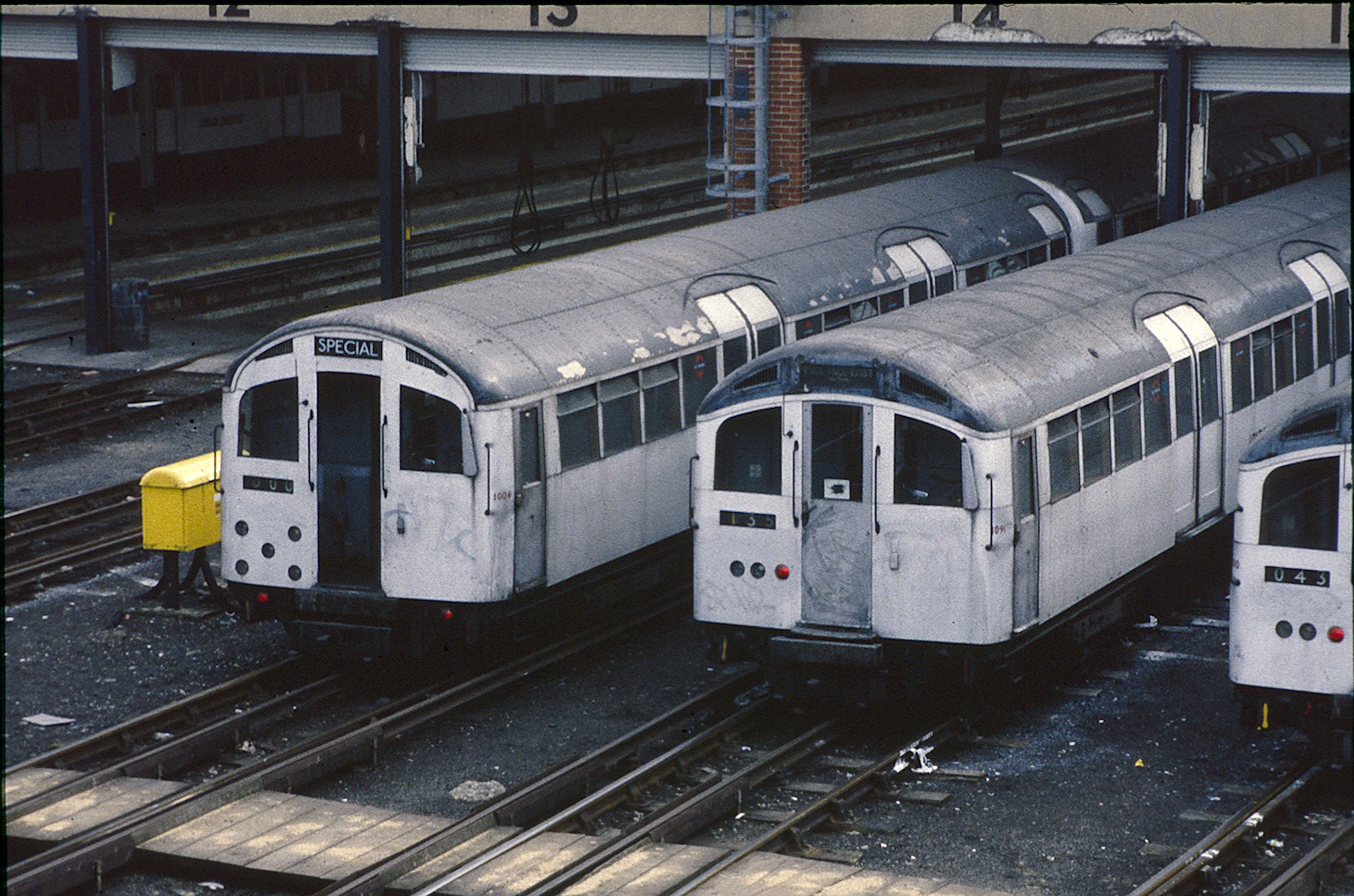
Trains of 1956 Stock (left) and 1959 Stock (right), for which they were the prototype, stabled at Morden Depot in 1988

Four speed settings were possible, three provided by the main controller, and the fourth by a weak field flag switch. Shunt mode was used in depots and yards and was achieved by connecting resistance banks in series with the motors. In series mode, the resistance was removed in steps until the two motors were in series with the 600 V supply. The maximum speed in this mode was around 15 miles per hour (24 km/h). Parallel mode reconnected the motors in parallel across the supply and allowed operation up to normal full speed. The weak field flag switch allowed higher speeds still, but was only to be operated on open sections of the line. Its operation was visible from the outside of the train.

The first train began working on the Piccadilly line on 9 September 1957, and all three were operational by the following April. Trials went well, and the design became the prototype for the 1959 stock. An order for 76 seven-car trains was placed with Metro-Cammell, and the first unit entered service on 14 December 1959. All 76 were in service by 30 March 1962. Visually, they were very similar to the 1956 stock, the obvious difference being that the earlier stock had five lights on the front, which were used to display the destination of the train, and the later stock had two headlights. When the 1956 stock was delivered, it was numbered in a series starting at 40000, but when the 1959 units arrived, they were numbered from 1012 upwards, leaving space for the 1956 stock to be inserted at the start of the sequence once they had been modified to be compatible.

While in operational service, several changes were made to the vehicles. When first delivered, Wedglock automatic couplers were fitted to the motor cars in the middle of the train, providing mechanical, pneumatic and electrical connections. The motor cars at the outside ends of the units were only fitted with mechanical couplers. These were changed to Wedglock couplers as part of the work to make them compatible with the 1959 Stock. The renumbering of the cars into the same series as the 1959 Stock took place in 1965. In 1971–72, stabling lights were fitted, located at the bottom right of the five headcode lamps, and in 1989, the headcode lights were replaced by two headlights, although the placement was somewhat different from that of the 1959 Stock.

=== Demise ===
When 1973 Stock was bought to re-equip the Piccadilly line, the three 1956 Stock trains and the 1959 Stock trains were transferred to the Northern line. They continued to work there until the delivery of the 1992 Stock began to replace the 1962 Stock working on the Central line. A few of the 1962 Stock trains were moved to the Northern line in 1993, to enable the 1956 Stock to be withdrawn, and to provide a modest increase in the number of trains running on the line. Initially, four cars were moved to Upminster depot, awaiting scrapping, and another four went to Golders Green depot for storage.

== Bibliography ==
- Bruce, J Graeme (1988). The London Underground Tube Stock. Shepperton: Ian Allan and London Transport Museum. ISBN 978-0-7110-1707-8.
- Hardy, Brian (1984) [1976]. London Underground Rolling Stock (9th ed.). Harrow Weald: Capital Transport. ISBN 0-904711-58-7. ISSN 0140-8356.
- Hardy, Brian (1993). London Underground Rolling Stock (13th Ed.). Capital Transport. ISBN 978-1-85414-164-4.
- Hardy, Brian (2001). Underground Train File: Tube Stock 1933-1959. Capital Transport. ISBN 978-1-85414-235-1.
