= London Underground 1962 Stock =

British tube train class (1962–1999)

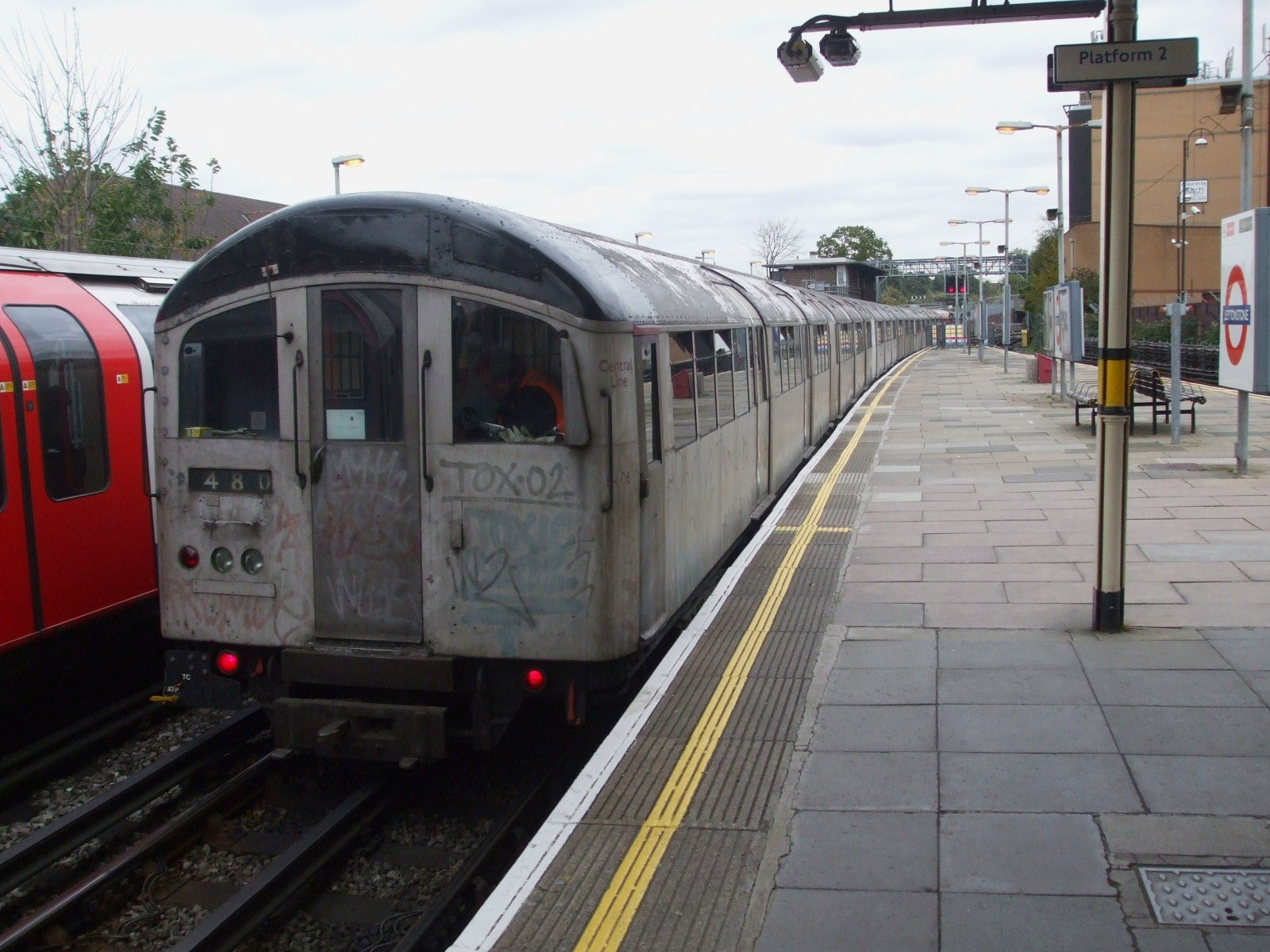
- 1962 stock at Leytonstone in 2008, in use as an engineering train
- Stock type: Deep-level tube
- In service: 12 April 1962 – 11 November 1999
- Manufacturer: Metro-Cammell /BR Derby
- Replaced: London Underground Standard Stock
- Successor: 1992 Stock; 1995 Stock

Specifications
- Car length: DM 50 ft 2 5/16 in (15.30 m); NDM 51 ft 2 13/16 in (15.62 m); T 51 ft 2 13/16 in (15.62 m)
- Width: 8 ft 6 1/4 in (2.597 m)
- Height: 9 ft 5 1/2 in (2.883 m)
- Weight: DM 26.62 long tons (27.05 t; 29.81 short tons); NDM 24.28 long tons (24.67 t; 27.19 short tons); T 20.67 long tons (21.00 t; 23.15 short tons)
- Seating: DM 42; NDM 40; T 40

The London Underground 1962 Stock was a type of London Underground tube train built for use on the Central line. They were used on the Central line between 1962 and 1995, with some later being transferred to the Northern line where they were used until 1999.

== Construction ==
The 1962 Stock was built by Metro-Cammell and the BR Workshops in Derby for use on the Central line. Each unit consisted of four cars; two outer driving motors (DM), an intermediate trailer (T), and an intermediate non-driving motor (NDM), formed DM + T + NDM + DM. A train usually consisted of two units working in multiple forming an eight-car train. Most 1962 stock units were 4 cars long, although an extra 3-car unit was also ordered; this vehicle lacked an NDM carriage and was numbered 1751. This unit was ordered specifically for the Aldwych shuttle until it was given a fourth car in 1989 and entered service on the Central Line.

The 1962 Stock was ordered as a matter of urgency to replace the Standard Stock previously used on the Central line. Two fires on Standard Stock units (in 1958 and 1960) resulted in the hospitalisation of dozens of passengers. This experience, plus rapidly increasing numbers of breakdowns, hastened the need to replace these trains (which dated back to the 1920s).

The 1962 Stock was ordered from the Birmingham Railway Carriage and Wagon Company (338 DM and 112 NDM) and from the British Railways workshops in Derby (169 T), a total of 619 cars. In 1961, BRCW asked to be relieved of their contract, as they were in financial difficulty, and the order was transferred to Metro-Cammell, and was delivered as a continuation of the 1959 stock.

As part of the 1959 Stock contract, Metro-Cammell were requested to construct an extra 57 NDM so that eight car trains of 1959 stock could be temporarily formed, such was the urgency to replace the trains on the Central line. The first 1962 stock train entered service on 12 April 1962, with all trains in service by 17 May 1964. All 1959 stock trains were transferred back to the Piccadilly line, less the 57 NDM of course which remained to be incorporated into the Central line trains, such that all trains operated were 8 cars long, formed DM + T + NDM + DM - DM + T + NDM + DM.

The 1962 Stock units were virtually identical to the earlier 1959 Stock units, which were built for the Piccadilly line, although a number of improvements were introduced as a result of experience with the earlier trains. As with the 1959 stock, the DM cars seated 42, the NDM and T cars seated 40 each. The major improvement was the use of motor alternators for the auxiliary supplies using static rectification, instead of the motor generator sets. The drivers brake valve used the more reliable poppet valve instead of rotary type face valves, and the electro-pneumatic valves used plug in connectors, speeding up replacement and reducing faults due to bad electrical connections.

== Replacement ==
By the early 1990s, the 1962 Stock was due for replacement. This came in the form of the new 1992 Stock, which was developed from the prototype 1986 Stock. The last train on the Central line ran on 17 February 1995. Most units were scrapped, although 15 were transferred to the Northern line to allow the withdrawal of the three prototype 1956 Stock trains as well as some 1972 Mk1 Stock units. However, their use on the Northern line was short-lived, as they were soon replaced by the 1995 Stock, and the final unit was withdrawn on 11 November 1999.

Several units remain in use as departmental vehicles. In addition, twelve cars (units 1616+1491, and unit 1744) were sold to the Epping Ongar Railway, but were scrapped after being destroyed by vandals while stabled at Ongar.

== Preservation ==
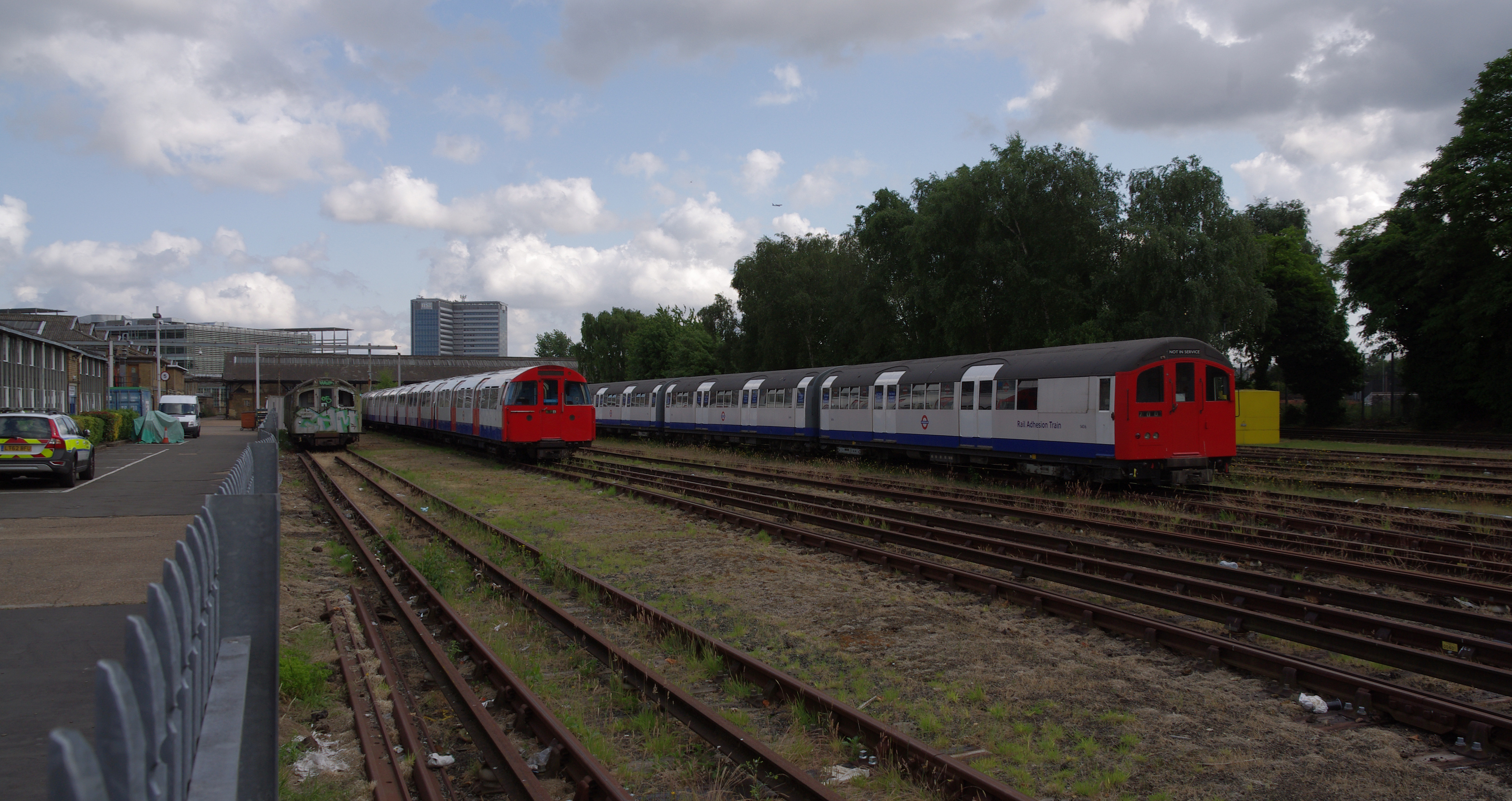
1962 Stock Rail Adhesion Train at Acton Works in 2013, next to a 1967 Stock and 1959 Stock

One complete unit was preserved by Cravens Heritage Trains in 1995 on withdrawal from service with London Underground. However, CHT announced in January 2023 that their unit had been sold back to London Underground for spare part recovery to maintain LU's Railhead Adhesion Trains.

DM	T	NDM	DM	Location
1506	2506	9507	1507	LUL Hainault Depot
1670	-	-	1671	LT Museum Acton (cabs only)

Key
DM	Driving motor
T	Trailer
NDM	Non-driving motor
