= London Underground 1992 Stock =

British train rolling stock

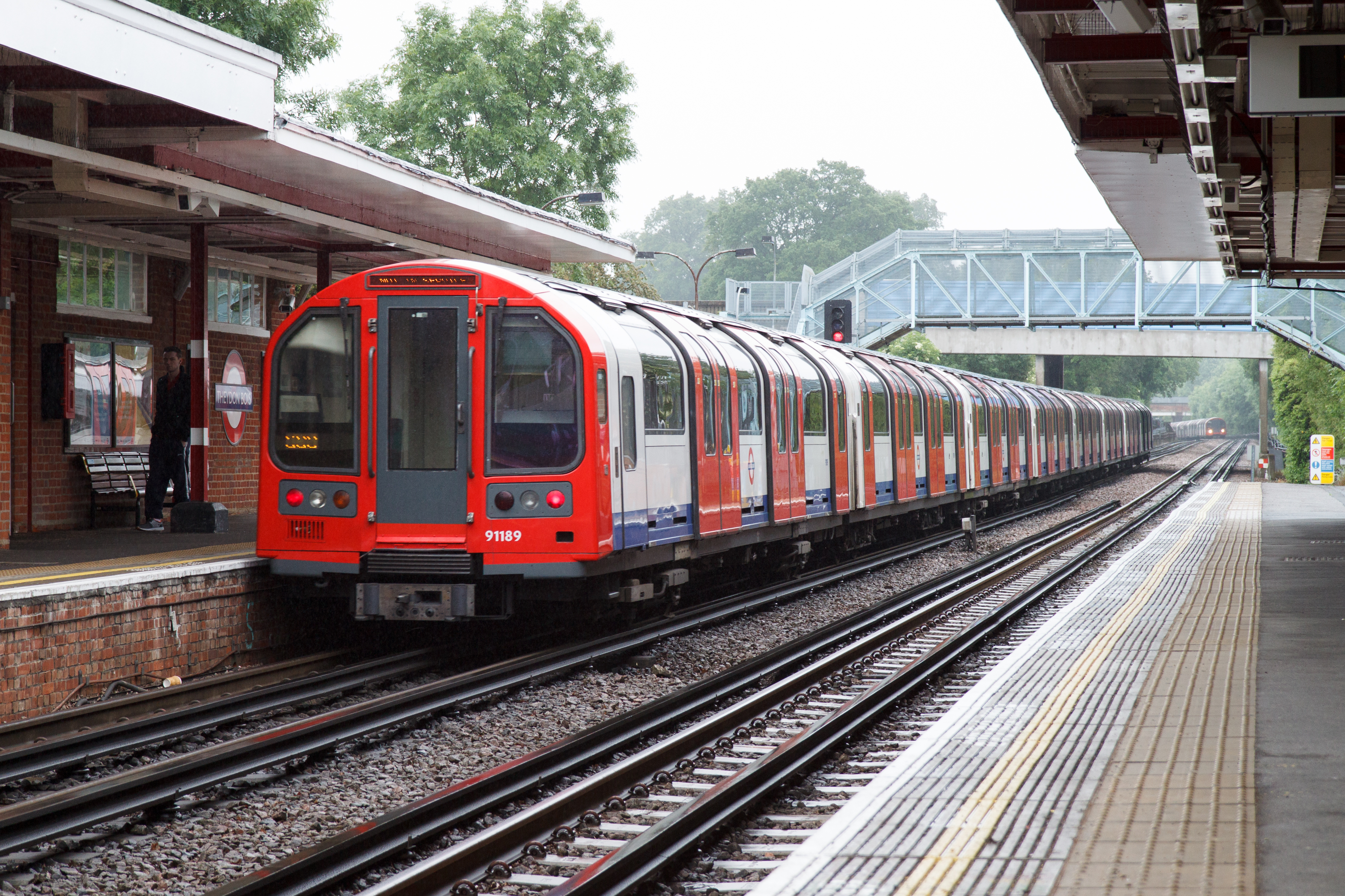
- Central line 1992 Stock departing Theydon Bois in 2012

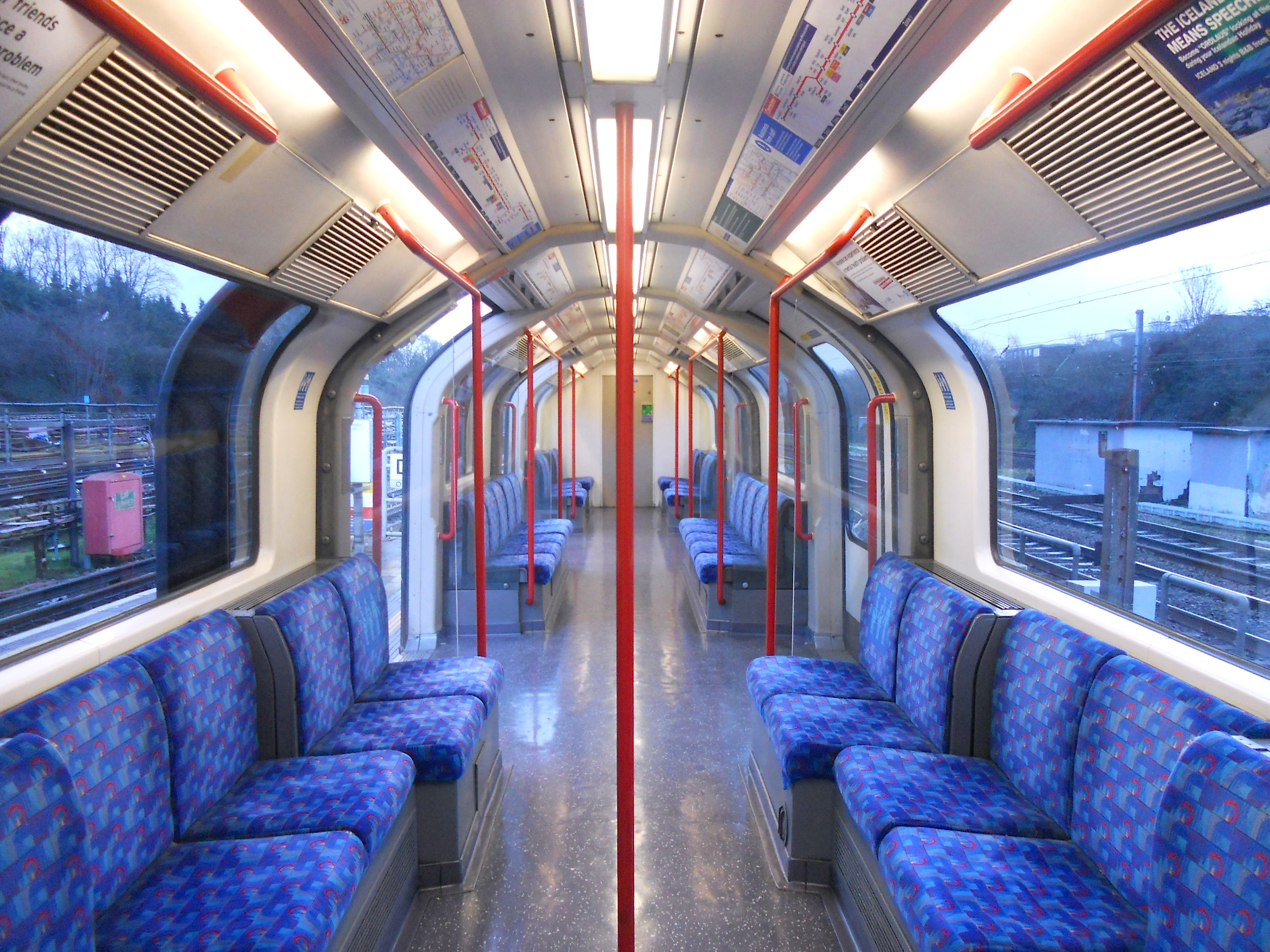
- The interior of a Central line 1992 Stock
- Stock type: Deep-level tube
- In service: 7 April 1993–present
- Manufacturer: BREL/ABB
- Built at: Derby Litchurch Lane Works
- Replaced: British Rail Class 487; 1962 Stock
- Constructed: 1991–1994
- Entered service: 7 April 1993 (Central line); 19 July 1993 (Waterloo & City line)
- Refurbished: 2006 (Waterloo & City line sets); 2019–present (Central line sets)
- Number built: 700 cars: 85 trains for the Central line; 5 trains for the Waterloo & City line
- Formation: 8 cars per train (Central line); 4 cars per train (Waterloo & City line)
- Capacity: 1047 per train (Central Line); 506 per train (Waterloo & City)
- Lines served: Central; Waterloo & City

Specifications
- Car length: 16.25 m (53 ft 3 3/4 in)
- Width: 2.62 m (8 ft 7 1/8 in)
- Height: 2.87 m (9 ft 5 in)
- Maximum speed: 100 km/h (62 mph)
- Weight: 20.5–22.5 tonnes (20.2–22.1 long tons; 22.6–24.8 short tons) (per car)
- Traction system: ABB/Brush Traction GTO chopper (as built); Alstom MITRAC(after refurbishment)
- Traction motors: Brush Electrical Machines LT130 DC motor (as built); Alstom AC motor (after refurbishment)
- Electric systems: Fourth rail, 630 V DC (Central line); Fourth rail, 750 V DC (Waterloo & City Line)
- Current collection: Contact shoe
- Bogies: H-Frame (Kawasaki Heavy Industries as built, Siemens after replacement since 2013)
- Safety systems: ATO, ATP (Central line only)
- Seating: 272 per train (Central Line); 136 per train (Waterloo & City)

The London Underground 1992 Stock is a type of rolling stock used on the Central and Waterloo & City lines of the London Underground. A total of 85 eight-car trains were built for the Central line and 5 four-car trains were built for the Waterloo & City line.

On the Central line, trains entered service in April 1993, with automatic train operation (ATO) and automatic train protection (ATP) effectively allowing the trains to drive themselves. Since 2019, these trains are being refurbished, which includes the replacement of the original motors, installation of CCTV and an overhauled interior.

On the Waterloo & City line, trains entered service as Class 482 in July 1993, before transferring to London Underground in April 1994. These trains were refurbished in the mid 2000s, replacing the Network SouthEast livery with London Underground livery.

== Construction ==
The 1992 Stock was built by British Rail Engineering Limited (BREL) (under ABB) for the Central line following extensive testing of the three 1986 tube stock prototype trains.

Eighty-five 8-car trains were ordered from BREL, each formed of four two-car units (two units had driving cabs, the others were fitted with shunting controls). Upon entering service in April 1993, the new trains gradually replaced the previous 1962 tube stock, which was completely withdrawn two years later. The trains were manufactured at the Derby Litchurch Lane Works.

The original propulsion for the trains was manufactured by a consortium of ABB and Brush Traction, and was one of the first examples of microprocessor-controlled traction featuring a fibre-optic network to connect the different control units. The DC traction motors of LT130 type have separately-excited fields and are controlled via GTO (Gate turn-off) thyristors. These would be the only tube trains to use this type of DC motor, and would be the last newly built train on the London Underground with DC motors, and the second to last in the United Kingdom, only succeeded by the Phase 3 MTR Metro Cammell EMUs in Hong Kong which continued to be produced until the transfer of sovereignty in 1997. These are currently in the process of being replaced with the more efficient AC motors.

A wheel slide protection (WSP) system had to be retrofitted due to the fleet suffering an epidemic problem of wheel flats. This was largely due to an excessive number of emergency brake applications caused during the ATO/ATP testing phases.

The 1992 stock's design is reminiscent of the 1986 prototypes. The 2009 stock trains, built by Bombardier Transport for the Victoria line, are more like the 1992 stock in shape and design than the 1995/1996 stock.

=== Waterloo & City line sets ===
After the initial construction run, an additional 5 four-car units were built for British Rail for the Waterloo & City line, which at the time was part of the national railway network. Following commissioning, they were delivered by road to the Waterloo & City line during May and June 1993, and following testing entered service on 19 July 1993. The trains were designated as Class 482 until 1 April 1994, when the operation of the line and the trains were transferred to London Underground and the trains were simply referred to as 1992 Stock. The vehicles are essentially identical to those used on the Central line; the main difference being that trip-cocks are used for protection instead of ATO/ATP.

Transport for London and Metronet closed the Waterloo & City line for five months from April to September 2006 to allow major upgrade work on the tunnels and rolling stock. The line's limited access meant that this was the first time that the units had been brought above ground since their introduction 12 years earlier. The refurbishment of the trains saw them painted in the London Underground white, red and blue livery in place of the Network SouthEast colours used since the stock's introduction.

== Operation ==
The 1992 Stock features both automatic train operation (ATO) and automatic train protection (ATP) which effectively allow the trains to drive themselves. The ATO is responsible for operating the train whilst the ATP detects electronic codes in the track and feeds them to the cab, displaying the target speed limits. This functionality is configured via a master switch in the driver's cab which can be set to one of three positions: Automatic, Coded Manual and Restricted Manual.

In Automatic mode the ATO and ATP are both fully operational. The driver is only required to open and close the doors and press a pair of "Start" buttons when the train is ready to depart. The driver is then tasked with overseeing the operation of the system and can intervene at any time. The ATO controls the train to the desired target speed, whilst the ATP is ready to apply the emergency brakes if the Maximum Safe Speed is exceeded. However, it is not communications-based train control found on the other lines.

In Coded Manual mode, the ATO is disabled and the driver operates the train manually, however, the ATP is still detecting the codes in the track and restricting the driver's actions. The speedometer on 1992 stock is of the horizontal strip design showing two speeds: the Current Speed in green, indicating the speed at which the train is actually travelling, and the Target Speed indicating the speed at which the train should be travelling. Although the target speed is always active whilst running in Automatic or Coded Manual mode, in the latter mode a change in the target speed is indicated with an upwards or downwards tone depending on whether the target speed is increasing or decreasing. Should the driver exceed the target speed, an alarm sounds and the emergency brakes are automatically applied until the train is below the target speed; the alarm then stops, for example if the target speed is 30 mph and the driver is going at 35 mph the emergency brakes will slow the train down to 29 mph.

In Restricted Manual mode, the train cannot exceed 18 km/h (11.2 mph) and the motors automatically cut out at 16 km/h (9.9 mph). The ATO and ATP are both disabled and the driver operates the train entirely by sight and according to the signals. This mode is used when there has been an ATP or signal failure, or in a depot where ATP is not used, e.g. West Ruislip and Hainault depots. On the main line, driving in ATO is the same for a train driver as driving through a section where signals have failed.

== Announcer system ==
The 1992 Stock was the first of its type on the Underground to have a DVA (Digital Voice Announcer) from new. Until 2003, the DVA was voiced by then BBC journalist and presenter Janet Mayo. (Note: This original format of the announcements were "this train terminates at..." instead of "this is a Central line train to...") (Note: The original format also featured interchanges with Network SouthEast services rather than National Rail (or British Rail), particularly at Bank, where, despite the Waterloo & City line being transferred to the London Underground in 1994, the announcements were not updated.)

Since 2003, voice artist Emma Clarke has provided recordings for the 1992 Stock DVA. The new announcer system also includes next station announcements, which the original system did not include. By 2009, the announcements changed to address other lines that are possible to interchange in alphabetical order. Clarke's voice lasted until the refurbishment of the rolling stock, when Adrian Hieatt became the voice of the 1992 Stock's announcer system.

In January 2018, the announcements were again revised for certain stations, to include new lines and connections (such as London Overground, TfL Rail and the construction of Wood Lane station) that did not exist in 2003.

== Chancery Lane derailment ==
On 25 January 2003, a 1992 Stock train with approximately 500 people on board train derailed as it entered Chancery Lane station on the westbound line. The derailment resulted in one door being ripped off and a number of broken windows. 32 passengers received minor injuries.

The cause of the derailment was determined to be the detachment of the rearmost traction motor on the fifth car, caused by a gearbox failure. The traction motor was then struck by the remainder of the train as it passed over it, causing the following bogies to derail.

The entire 1992 Stock fleet was withdrawn from service the same afternoon, and the Central and Waterloo & City lines were closed for several weeks until modifications were made. This included fitting new traction-motor bolts and secondary brackets to prevent a loose motor from striking the track and causing further damage. The lines re-opened in stages from 14 March 2003.

== Refurbishment ==
=== Central line units ===
==== 2011–2012 ====
From 2011 to 2012, the Central line 1992 Stock units underwent a refresh of both the interior and exterior. Some of the noticeable changes included the addition of the new "Barman" seat moquette, new brighter interior lighting and the installation of new window frames. The front of the driving cabs were also refreshed. This included repairing water ingress and replacing a large number of parts with a much simpler design, saving costs on future work and cleaning up the appearance of the front end. The new-style front end can be easily identified by the new red panelling installed on most units instead of the original grey. The refresh came after nearly twenty years of continuous service on the Central line.

==== 2019–present ====
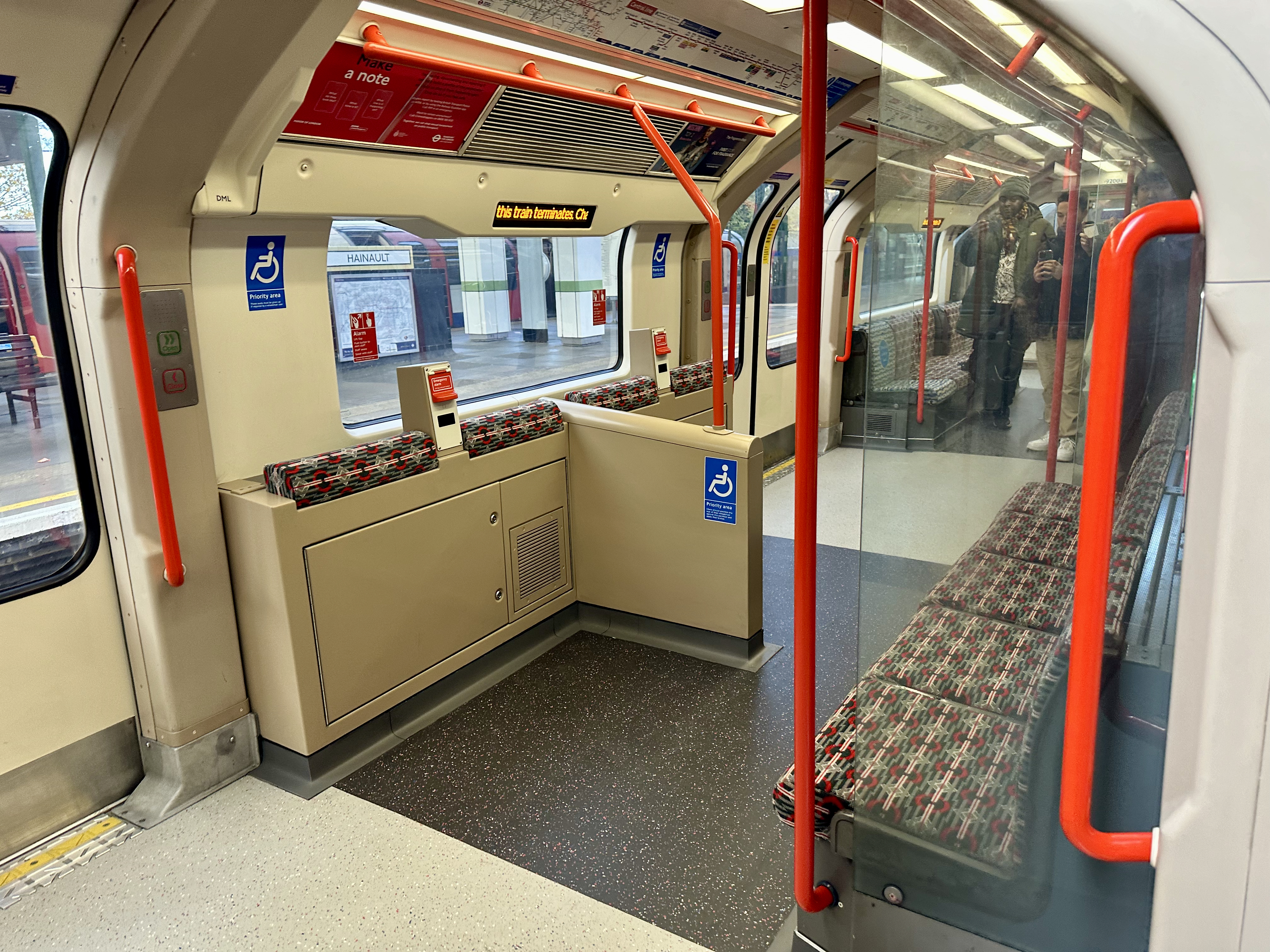
New wheelchair space on the first CLIP-refurbished 1992 Stock train

In 2019, TfL started a major refurbishment on the Central line trains as part of the Central Line Improvement Programme (CLIP). This includes a complete overhaul of train interiors, adding wheelchair spaces and passenger information screens, and installing CCTV throughout the trains. The London Underground corporate livery is being repainted, and the original DC motors replaced with new AC motors. Each train refurbishment takes approximately ten weeks. Work started in 2019 but was heavily delayed by the COVID-19 pandemic and financial reasons. The first refurbished train re-entered service in 2023. By January 2025, with £160m of the original £500m budget spent, only one refurbished train had entered service with a further three expected to be completed by the end of 2025.

In 2025, TfL noted that thirteen cars had been out of service for a long period, with two "unlikely to return to service".

=== Waterloo & City line units ===
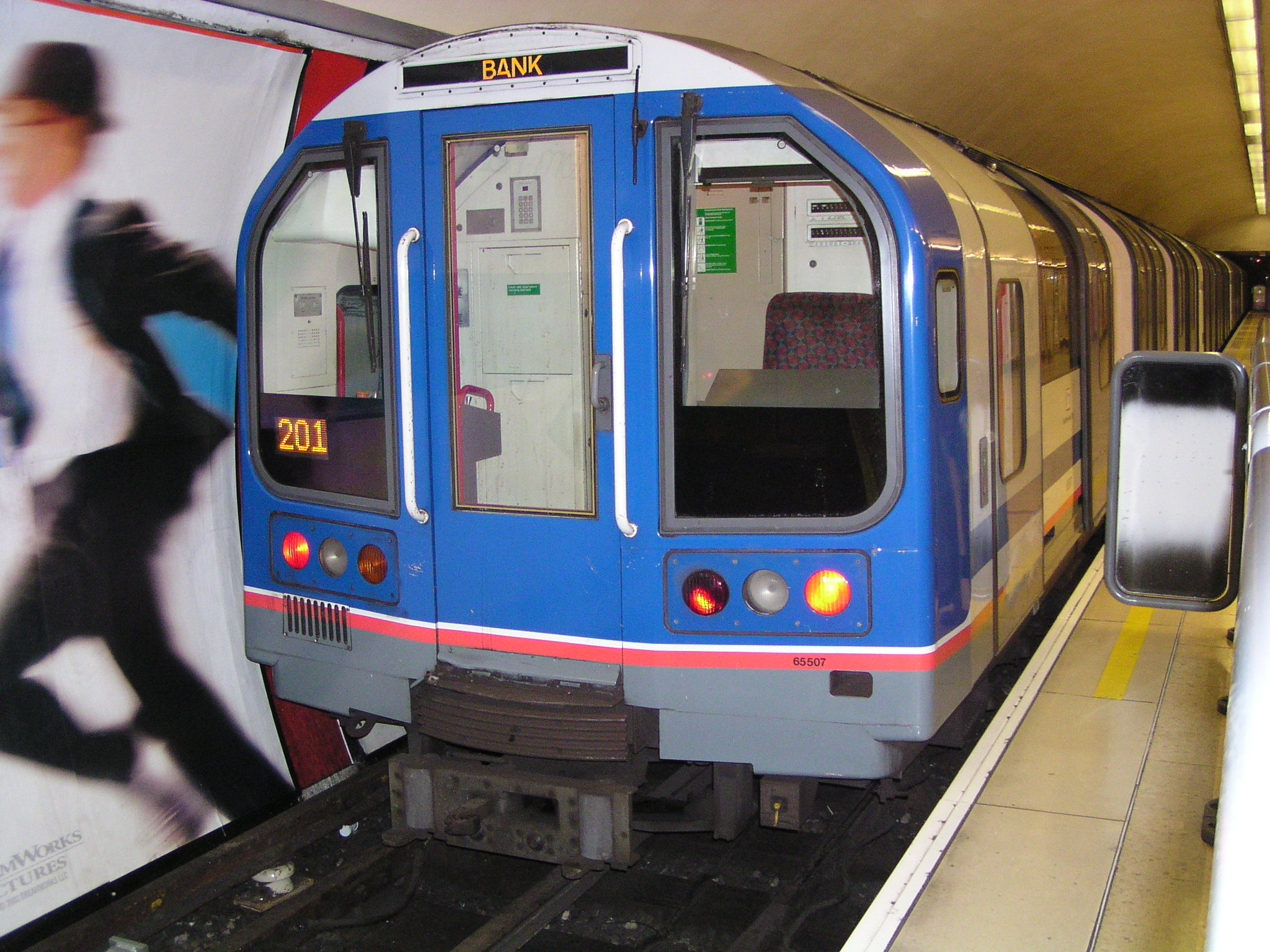
Waterloo & City line 1992 Stock in its original Network SouthEast livery at Bank in 2003.

In 2006, the Waterloo & City line was closed for several months to allow for track and signalling upgrade works. During this period, the 1992 Stock units in use on the line were removed by crane from Waterloo depot and taken by road to Wabtec Rail in Doncaster for refurbishment. External changes included repainting the trains, which were still in Network SouthEast livery, into London Underground's corporate livery. Internally, the handrails were repainted from Central line red to Waterloo & City line turquoise, new seat moquette was fitted and CCTV cameras were installed. Later, the units received the new "Barman" moquette fitted to the Central line units, but not the new lighting, window frames or front end.

== Future replacement ==
In the mid 2010s, TfL began a process of ordering new rolling stock to replace trains on the Piccadilly, Central, Bakerloo and Waterloo & City lines. A feasibility study showed that new-generation trains and resignalling could increase capacity on the Central line by 25% and on the Waterloo & City line by 50%.

In June 2018, the Siemens Mobility Inspiro design was selected. These trains will have an open-gangway design, wider doorways, air conditioning and the ability to run automatically with a new signalling system. TfL could only afford to order Piccadilly line trains (2024 Stock) at a cost of £1.5bn. However, the contract with Siemens includes an option for 100 trains for the Central line and 10 for the Waterloo and City line in the future. Based on a November 2021 paper, due to a lack of funding, this might not happen until the late 2030s or early 2040s, when the trains would be 40 to 50 years old.
