= SR Class CW =

Class of British electric multiple units

LB&SCR Coulsdon North & Sutton stock
- In service: 1925–1929
- Manufacturer: Metropolitan Carriage, Wagon and Finance Company
- Constructed: 1923–1924
- Number built: 101 vehicles
- Formation: 5-car sets: DTT-DTC-MLV-TC-DTT
- Operator: Southern Railway

Specifications
- Car length: MLV: 42 ft 1 in (12.83 m)
- Weight: MLV: 62 long tons (63 t; 69 short tons)
- Power output: 1,000 hp (750 kW)
- Transmission: Four GEC traction motors of 250 hp (186 kW)
- Electric system: 6.7 kV AC overhead lines
- Current collection: Bow collector
- Track gauge: 4 ft 8 1/2 in (1,435 mm) standard gauge

The Southern Railway (SR) gave the designation CW to the fleet of AC electric multiple units used on the lines to Coulsdon and Wallington. They were planned by the London, Brighton and South Coast Railway, but were delayed by World War I and the grouping and were introduced by the Southern Railway.

== Construction ==
The CW (Coulsdon and Wallington stock) units were built in 1923–1924, as the last electric train stock for use on the LBSCR AC overhead electrified lines in South London. This stock comprised some hundred carriages, which were used in five-car formations: Driving Trailer Third (DTT) + Driving Trailer Composite (DTC) + Motor Luggage Van (MLV) + Trailer Composite (TC) + Driving Trailer Third (DTT).

The stock, built by the Metropolitan Carriage, Wagon and Finance Company at Birmingham, was as follows:

- 21 Motor Luggage Vans
- 60 Driving Trailers
- 20 Trailers

The Motor Luggage Vans (nicknamed "Milk Vans") each had four 250 horsepower (190 kW) GEC traction motors.

After the replacement of the AC overhead equipment by the 660 V DC third rail system adopted as standard by the SR, the carriages that formed these units were rebuilt accordingly, the Motor Luggage Vans becoming bogie goods train brake vans.
