= London Underground 1986 Stock =

Prototype stock of the London Underground

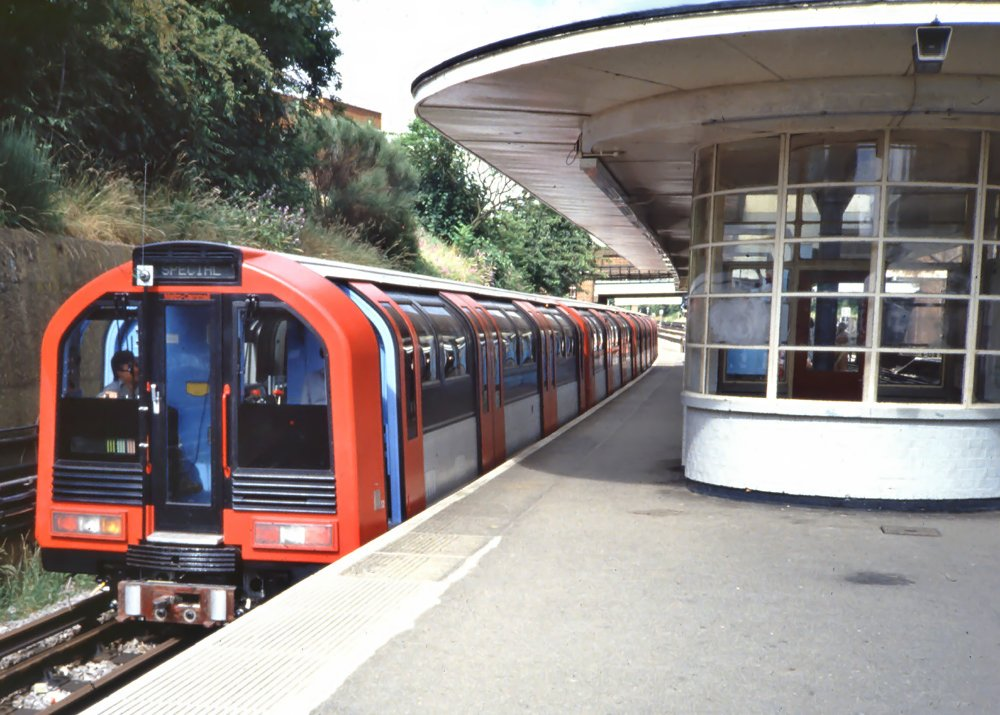
- Red prototype at South Ealing tube station

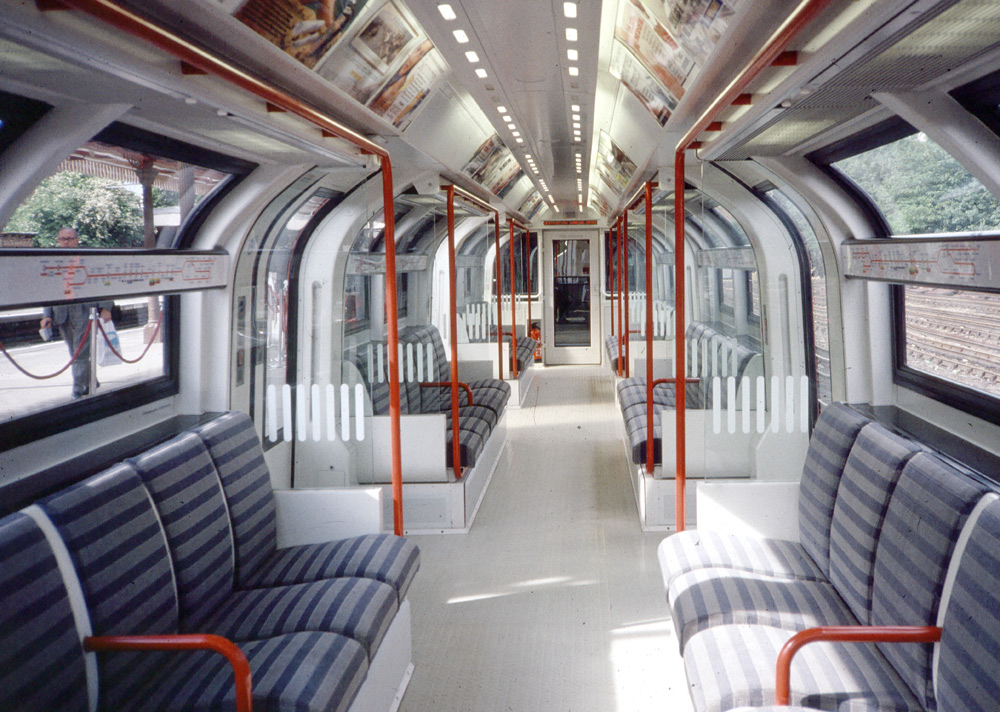
- Inside the red prototype when on public display at Woodford station.
- Stock type: Deep-level tube
- In service: 1988–1989
- Manufacturers: Metro-Cammell; British Rail Engineering Limited
- Built at: Washwood Heath; Derby Litchurch Lane Works
- Constructed: 1986–1987
- Number built: 12 carriages (3 trains)
- Formation: 4-car trains
- Lines served: Central, Jubilee

Specifications
- Car length: 16,850 mm (55 ft 3 in)
- Width: 2,750 mm (9 ft 0 in)
- Height: 2,910 mm (9 ft 7 in)
- Weight: 44.5 tonnes (98,000 lb) unloaded
- Traction system: GEC Traction; Brush Traction; Brown-Boveri
- Electric systems: 630 V DC fourth rail
- Current collection: Contact shoe
- Track gauge: 1,435 mm (4 ft 8 1/2 in) standard gauge

The London Underground 1986 Tube Stock consisted of three prototype electric multiple units built for the London Underground in 1986/87 that led to the development of the 1992 Stock.

== History ==
In 1984, London Transport ordered three different prototype trains to test new materials, construction methods and seating layouts. Two were built by Metro-Cammell at its Washwood Heath factory, and the third by British Rail Engineering Limited at its Derby Litchurch Lane Works.

Each train consisted of twin two-carriage motor car sets, with one car in each set being equipped with a cab. All were built to the same design and were able to operate in four, six or eight car formations, despite each set having different electrical equipment supplied by different manufacturers. The first was delivered in October 1986. To make their identification easier the prototypes were distinctively and individually coloured - red, blue and green.

After an extensive testing program on the deep level tube lines, they sporadically operated in passenger service on the Jubilee line between May 1988 and August 1989 in six-carriage formations, after which they entered storage. After being stored for seven years, all cars, except green driving motor No. 16, were scrapped in 1996. Afterwards the latter was stored at Ash Grove bus garage before moving to the London Transport Museum's Acton depot.

The public consultation results show that the green prototype was the favoured, and provided the core design basis for the 1992 Stock that was built for the Central line and for the Class 482 which was built for Network SouthEast's Waterloo & City line.

| Set | Manufacturer | Traction system | Carriage numbers |
|---|---|---|---|
| Red | Metro-Cammell | GEC Traction | 11-21-22-12 |
| Blue | British Rail Engineering Limited | Brush Traction | 13-23-24-14 |
| Green | Metro-Cammell | Brown-Boveri | 15-25-26-16 |

== Gallery ==
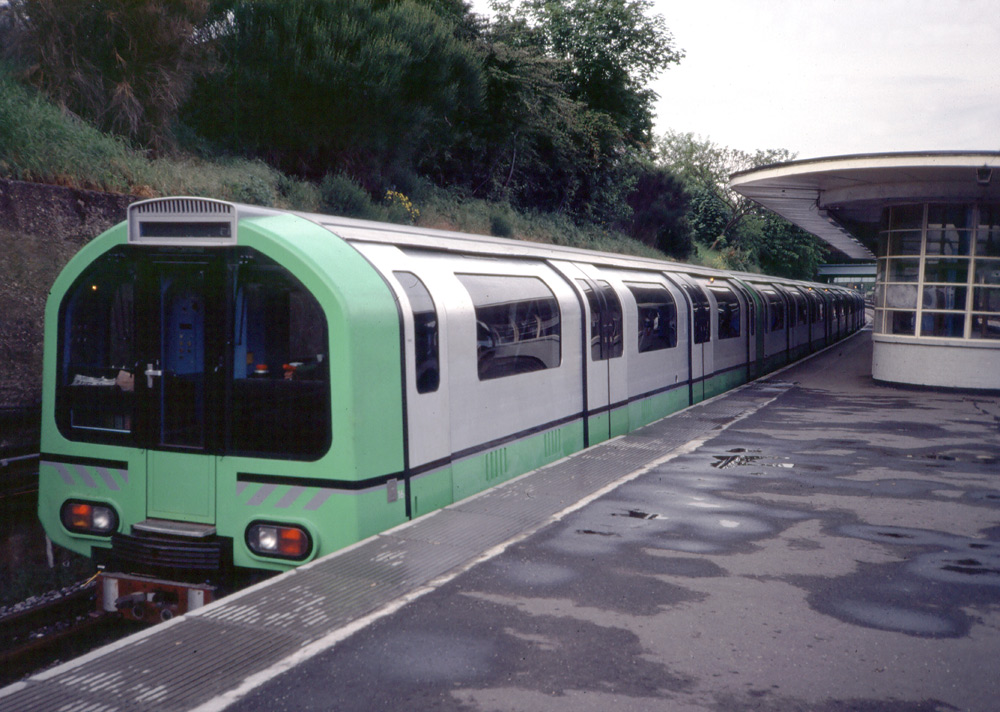
The green prototype at South Ealing.

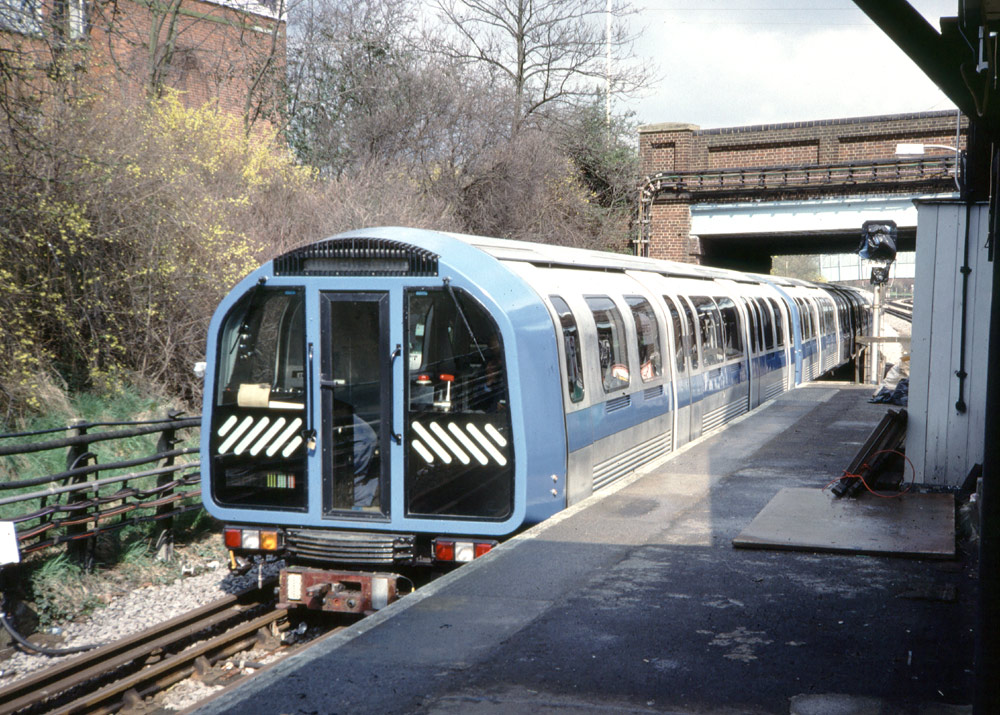
The blue prototype at South Ealing.

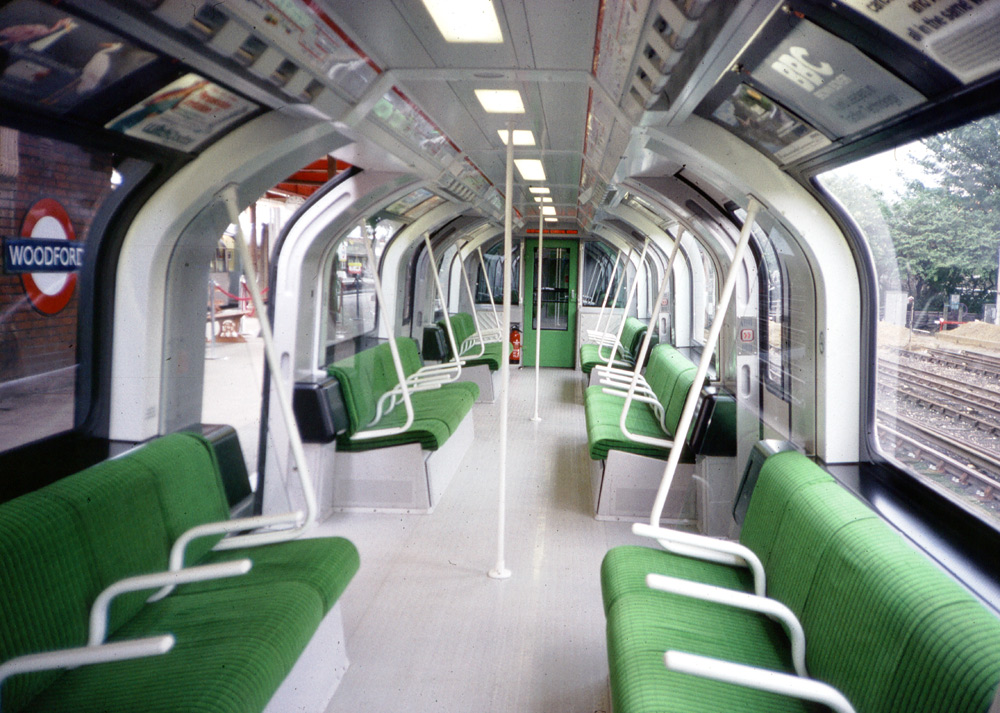
Inside the green prototype when on public display at Woodford station.

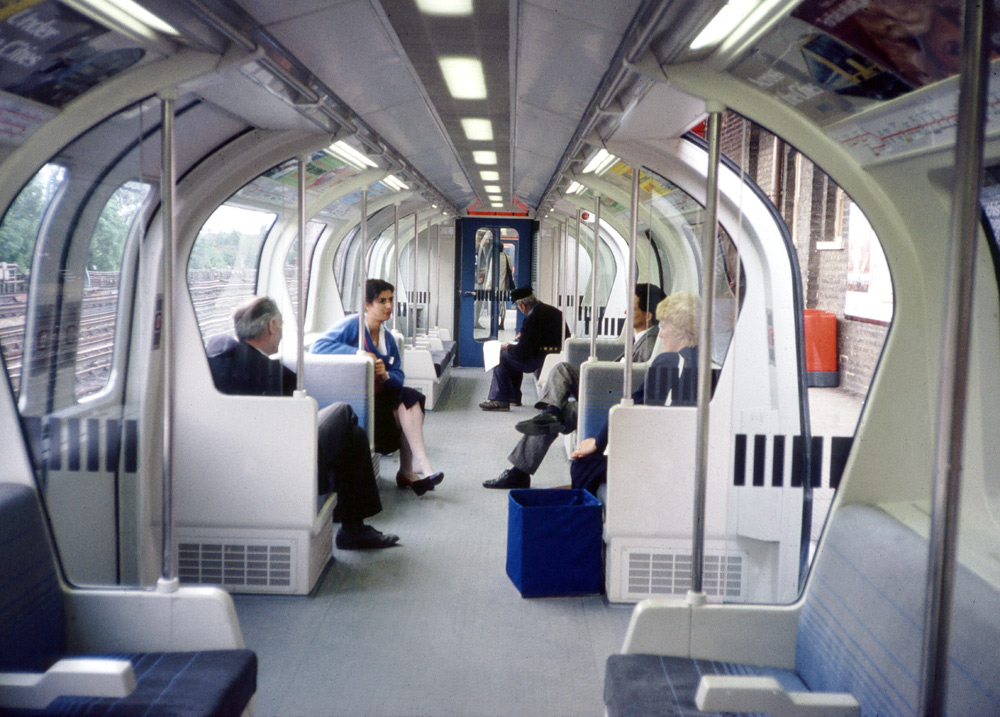
Inside the blue prototype when on public display at Woodford station.

== See also ==
- London Underground rolling stock
- London Underground 1992 Stock
- London Underground 1935 Stock
- British Rail Class 482
