= Metro-Cammell =

British manufacturer of railway locomotives and rolling stock

- Company type: Private
- Industry: Railway engineering
- Founded: 1863; 163 years ago
- Defunct: 1989; 37 years ago
- Fate: Acquired by Alstom
- Successor: Alstom
- Headquarters: Birmingham, England, UK
- Products: Railway carriages, locomotives, diesel multiple units and electric multiple units
- Parent: Independent (1863–1989); Alstom (1989–2005)

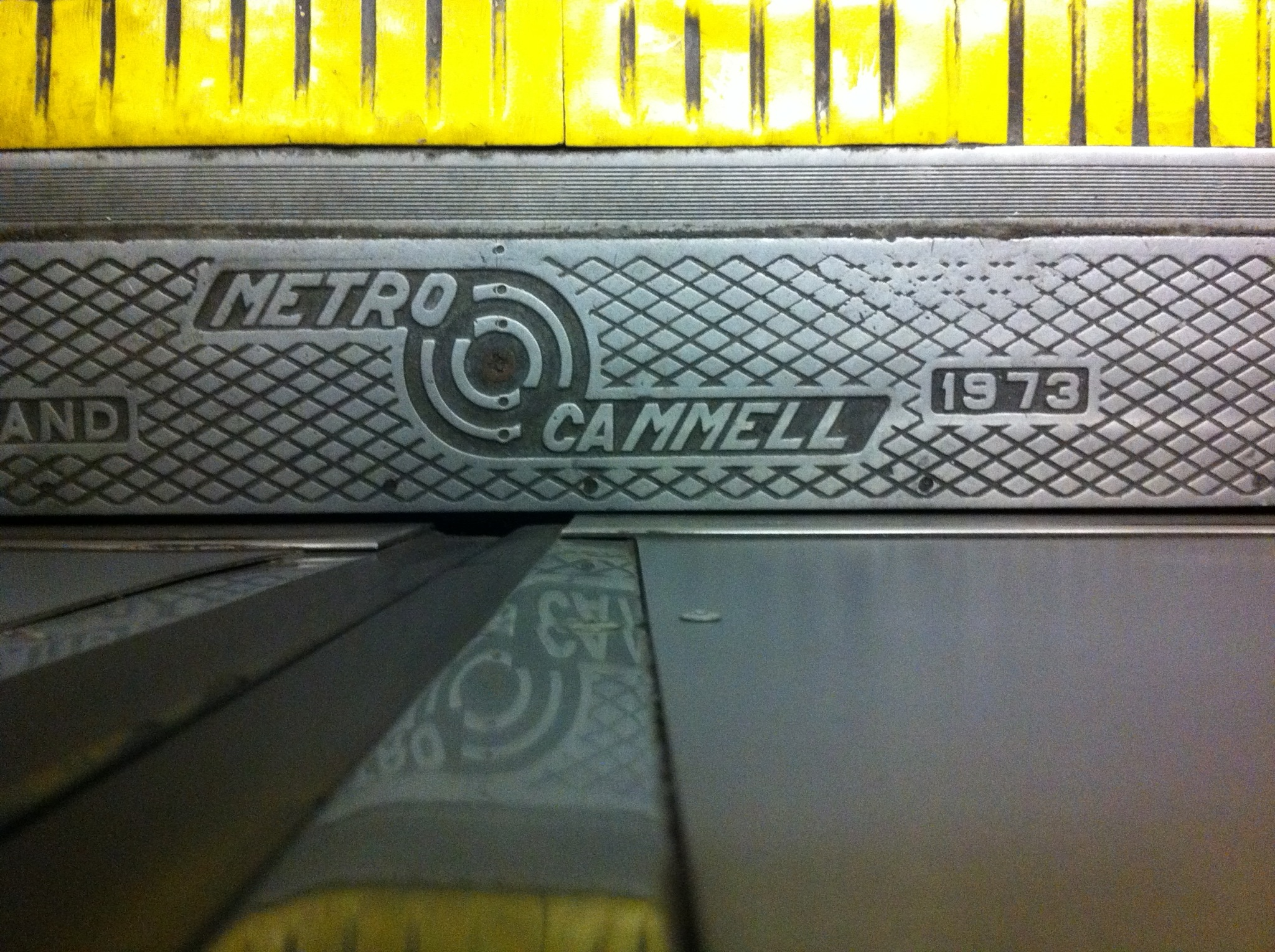
A door step plate from a unit of London Underground 1973 Stock, built by Metro-Cammell

Metro-Cammell, formally the Metropolitan Cammell Carriage and Wagon Company (MCCW), was an English manufacturer of railway carriages, locomotives and railway wagons, based in Saltley, and subsequently Washwood Heath, in Birmingham. The company was purchased by GEC Alsthom in May 1989; the Washwood Heath factory closed in 2005 and was demolished in early 2019.

The company designed and built rolling stock for the railways in the United Kingdom and overseas, including the Mass Transit Railway of Hong Kong, Kowloon–Canton Railway (now East Rail line and Tuen Ma Line), the Channel Tunnel, and the Tyne and Wear Metro, and locomotives for Malaysia's Keretapi Tanah Melayu. Diesel and electric locomotives were manufactured for South African Railways, Nyasaland Railways, Malawi, Nigeria, Trans-Zambezi Railway and Pakistan. DMUs were supplied to Jamaica Railway Corporation and the National Railways of Mexico. The vast majority of London Underground rolling stock manufactured in the mid-20th century was produced by the company, which also designed and built the Blue Pullman for British Railways.

== History ==
=== Metropolitan Railway Carriage and Wagon Company ===
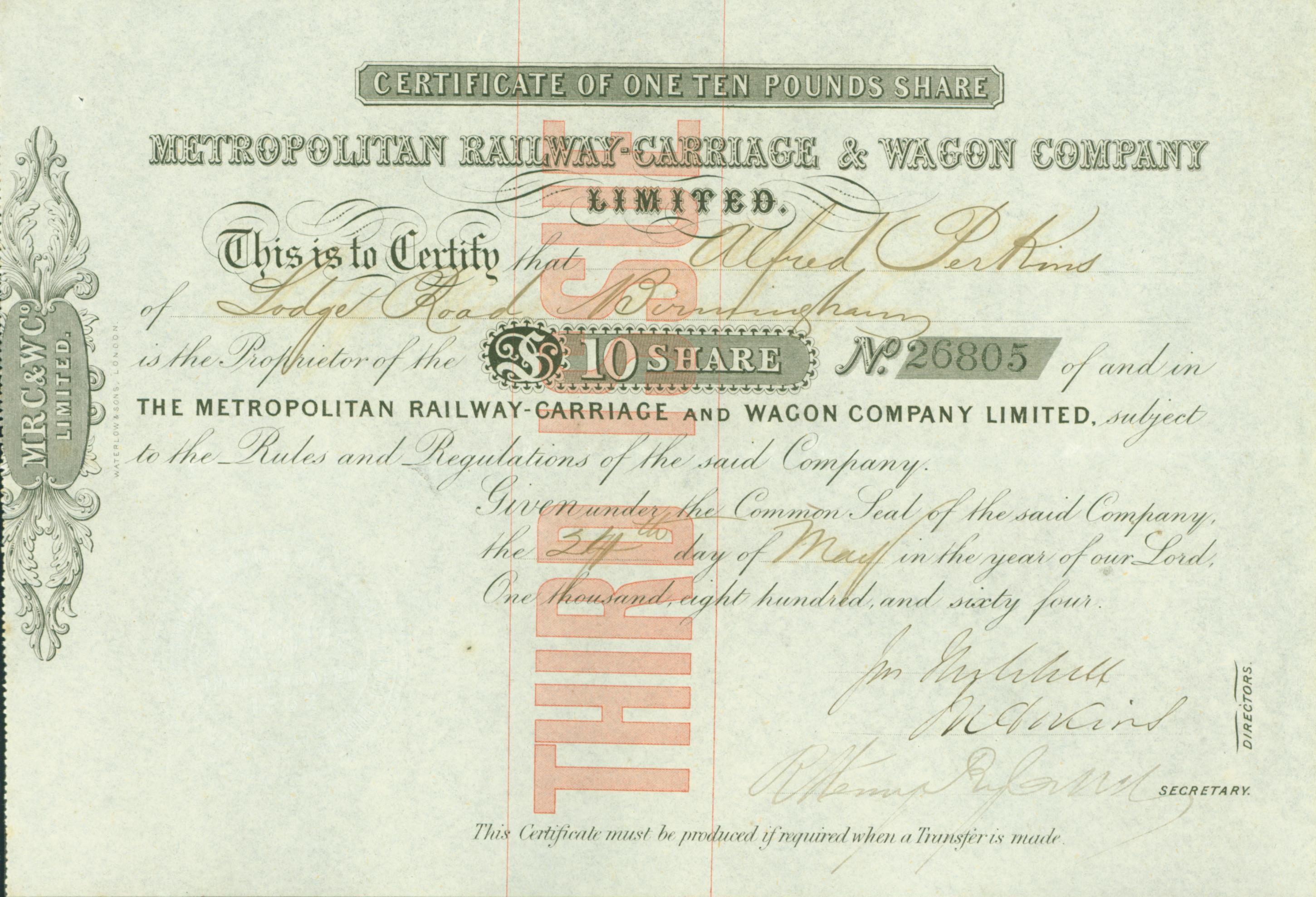
Share of the Metropolitan Railway-Carriage & Wagon Company Ltd., issued 24. May 1864

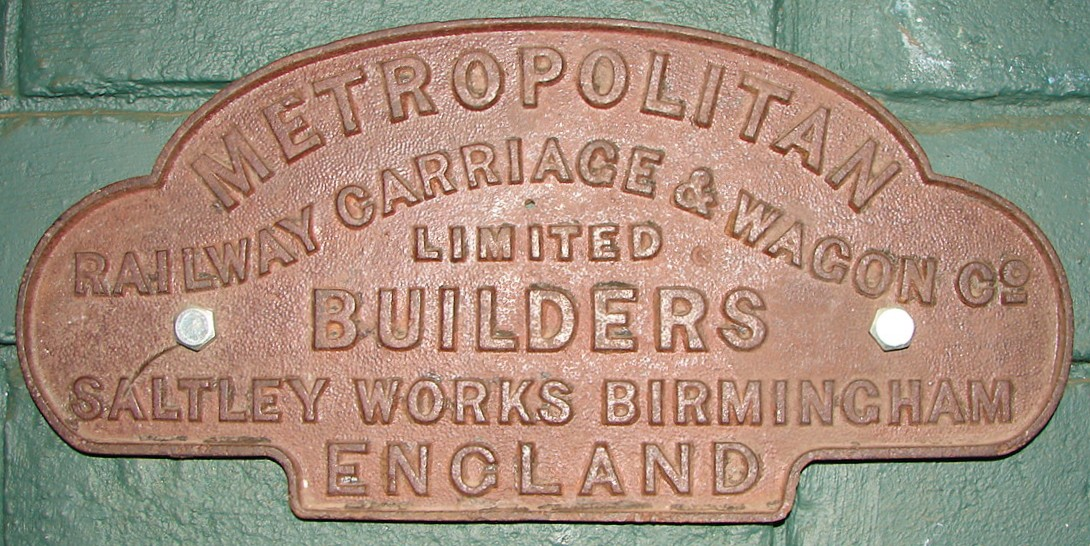

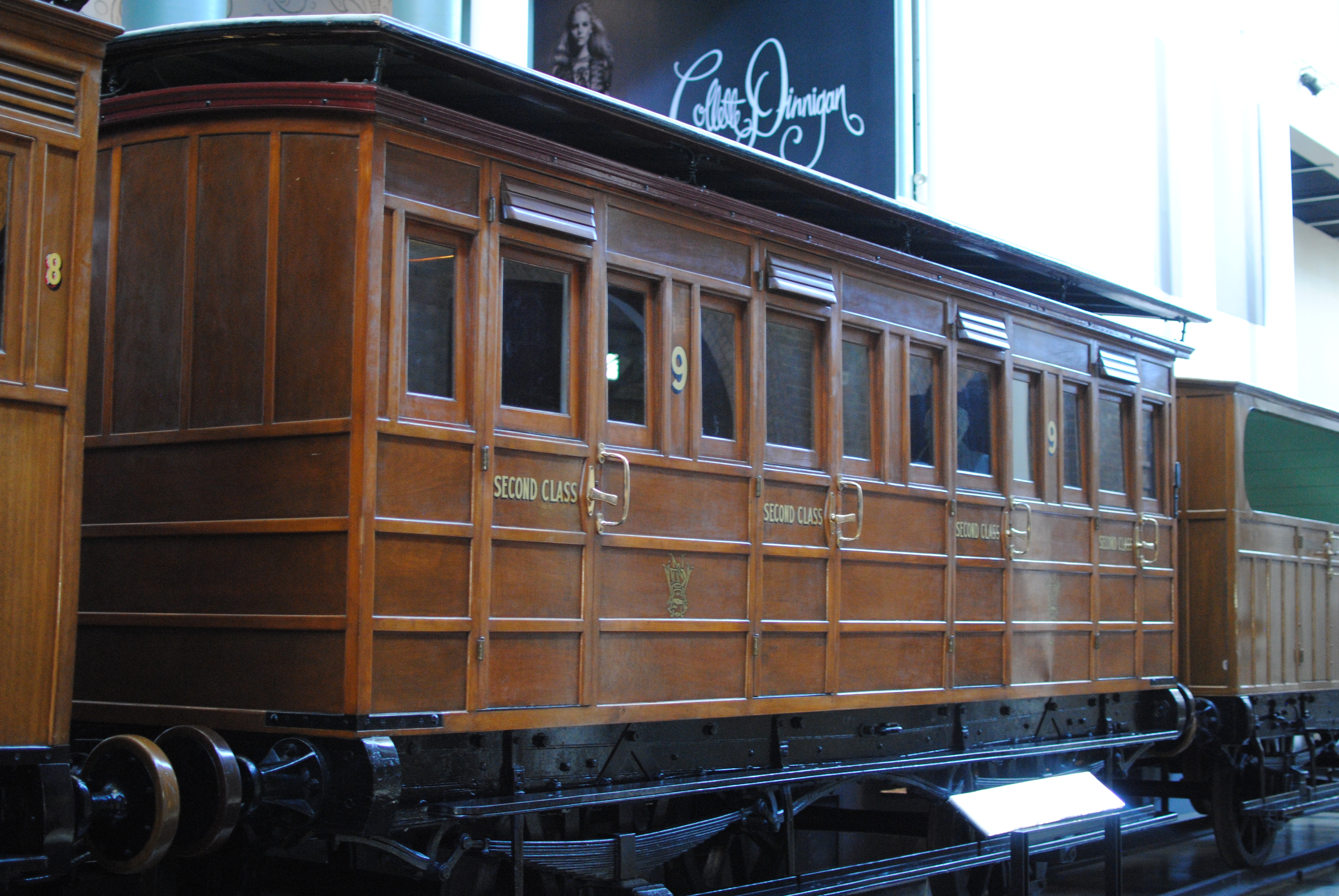
Second class coach of 1854, built by Joseph Wright and Sons, now in Powerhouse Museum, Sydney

The company was formed in 1863 as the Metropolitan Railway Carriage and Wagon Company , successors to Messrs. Joseph Wright and Sons. Joseph Wright built coaches for the London and Southampton Railway in 1837 and the London and Birmingham Railway in 1838. In 1845, he moved the carriage works from London to Birmingham, where he purchased 6 acres (2.4 ha) of meadowland in Saltley, adjacent to the Birmingham and Derby Junction Railway line. In 1854, the company built the first 12 carriages for the Sydney to Parramatta line, New South Wales, the first public railway in Australia, which opened in 1855. Several of those are now in the Powerhouse Museum in Sydney.

=== Metropolitan Amalgamated Railway Carriage and Wagon Company ===
In 1902, it merged with four other carriage and wagon builders: Ashbury Railway Carriage and Iron Company Ltd., Brown, Marshalls and Company Ltd., Lancaster Railway Carriage and Wagon Company Ltd., and Oldbury Railway Carriage and Wagon Company Ltd., and became the Metropolitan Amalgamated Railway Carriage and Wagon Company .

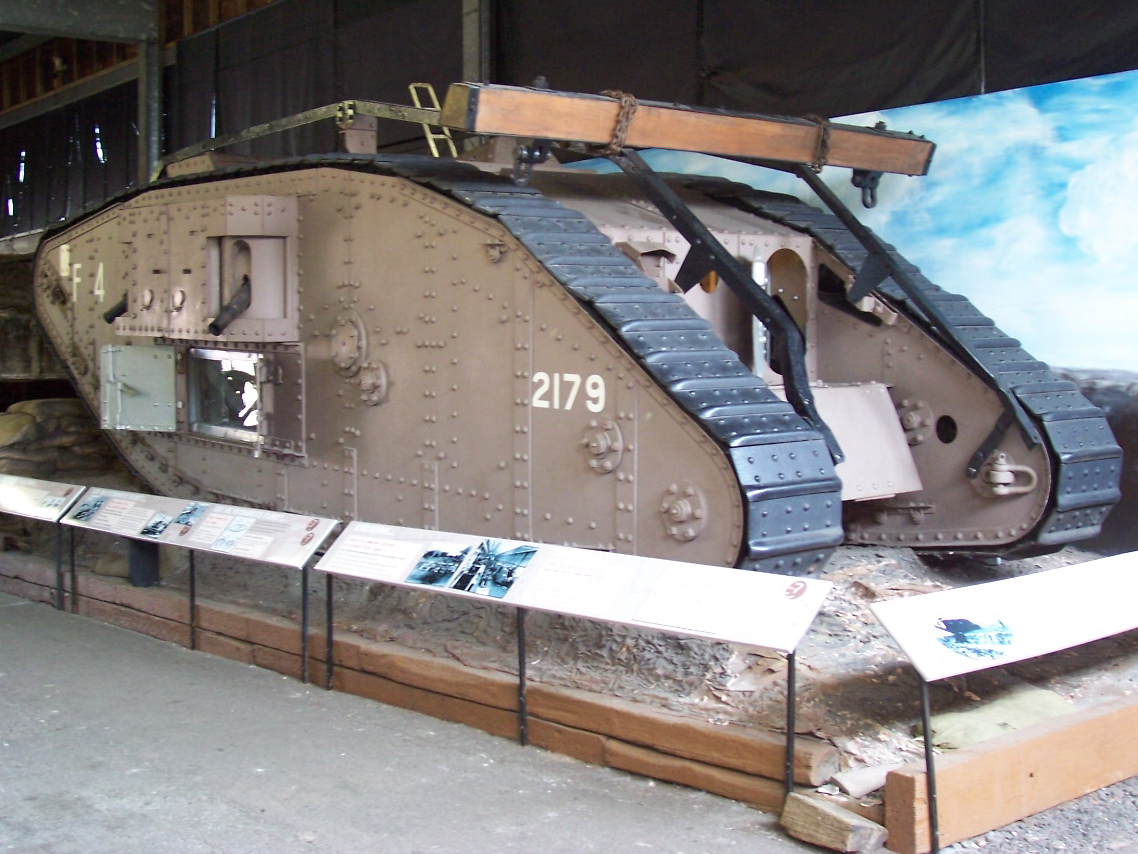
Flirt II, a WWI Mark IV "Female" tank, built by Metropolitan

Metropolitan was contracted as a builder of the new tanks for the British Army during the First World War. It built all 400 of the Mark V tank and 700 improved Mark V* tanks. These were the most developed heavy tank designs to see service in the war.

In 1917, Metropolitan Railway Carriage and Wagon Company and Vickers Limited took joint control of British Westinghouse. In 1919, Vickers bought out the Metropolitan shares and renamed the company Metropolitan-Vickers. By 1926, the company had changed its name again to Metropolitan Carriage, Wagon and Finance Company. In 1929, the railway rolling stock business of Cammell Laird and Company was merged as Metropolitan-Cammell Carriage and Wagon Company , the resulting company being part owned by Vickers and the Cammell Laird group.

MCCW also built bus bodies. In 1932, Metro Cammell Weymann was formed by the MCCW's bus bodybuilding business and Weymann Motor Bodies. In the Second World War, Metro again built tanks, including the Valentine tank and Light Tank Mk VIII. The Saltley works was closed in 1962 and group administration concentrated at Washwood Heath in 1967.

== Closure by Alstom ==
In May 1989, the railway business was sold to GEC Alsthom (now Alstom). The last trains to be built at the Washwood Heath plant before its closure in 2005 were the Class 390 Pendolino tilting trains for the West Coast Main Line modernisation.

== Products ==
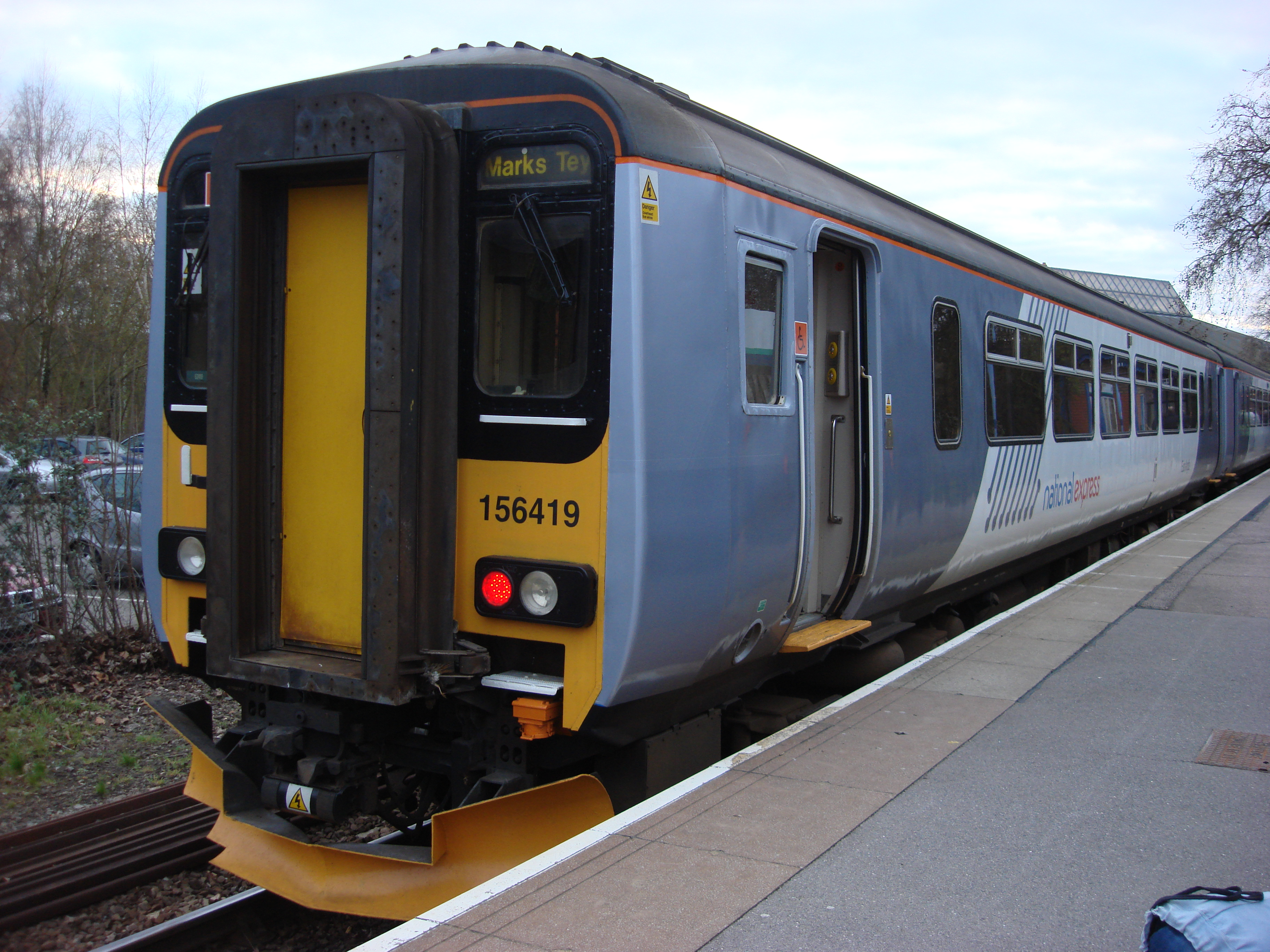
British Rail Class 156 "Super Sprinter" diesel multiple unit

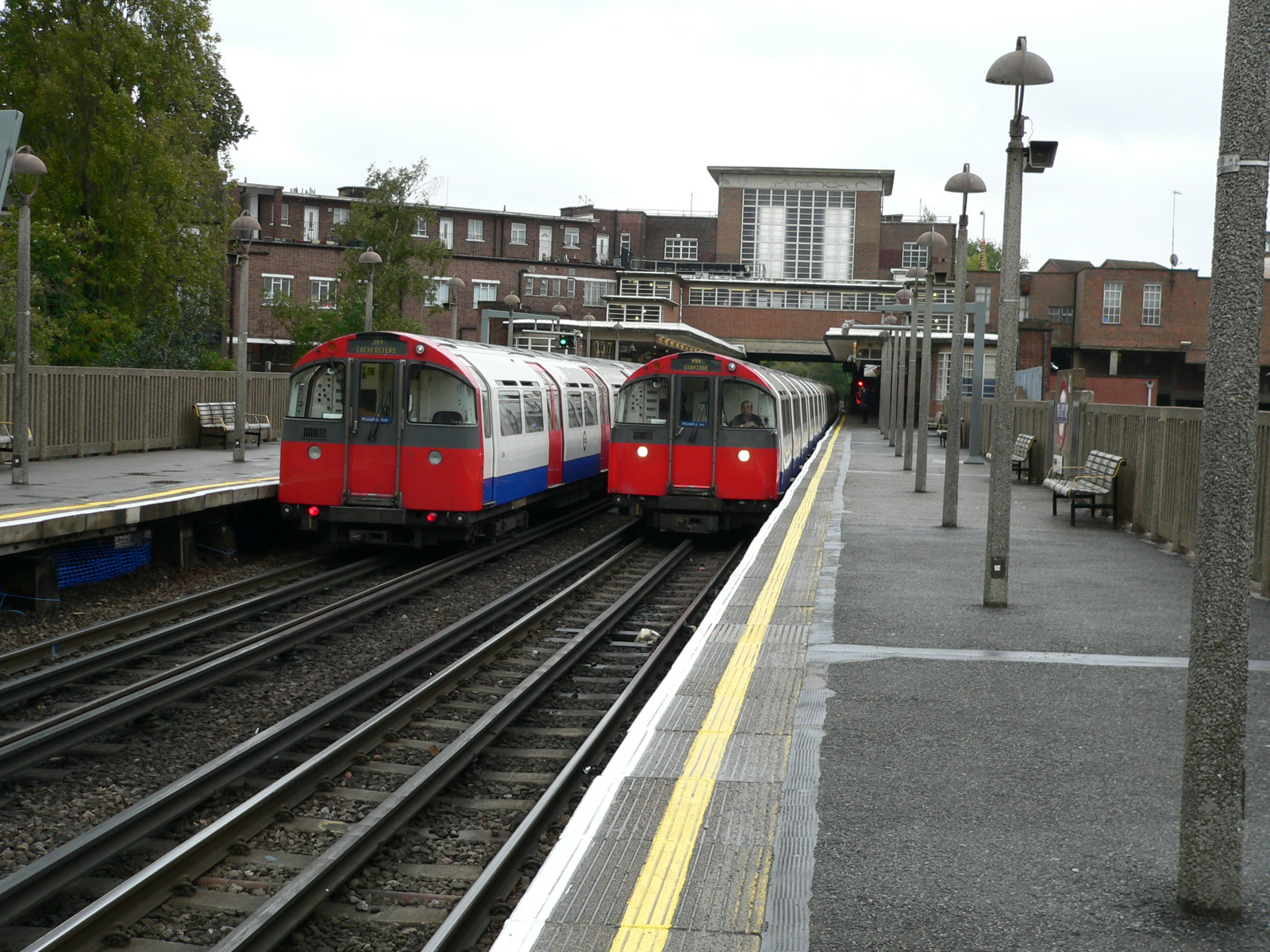
London Underground 1973 Stock

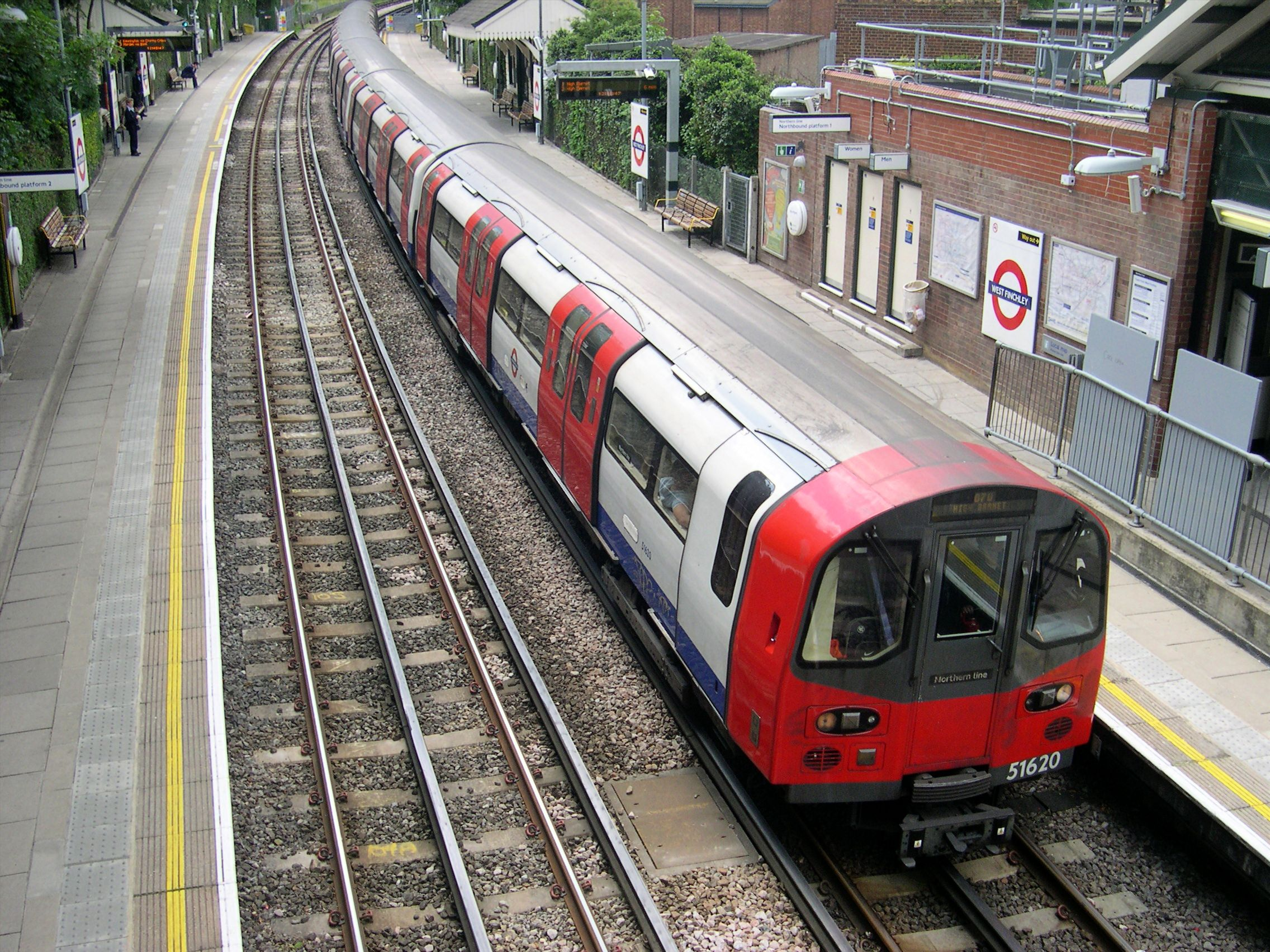
London Underground 1995 Stock

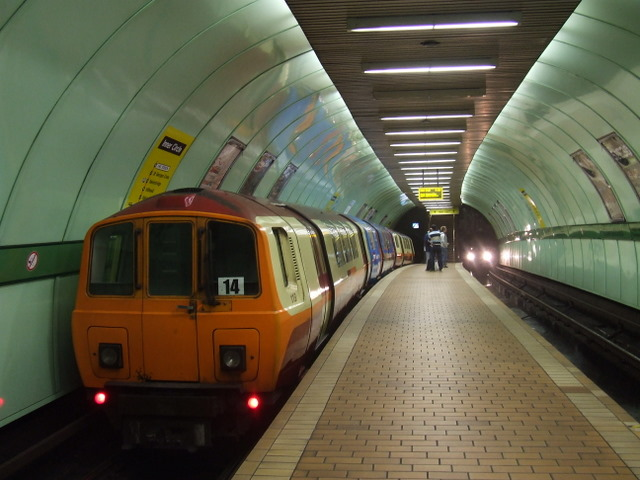
Glasgow Subway metro train

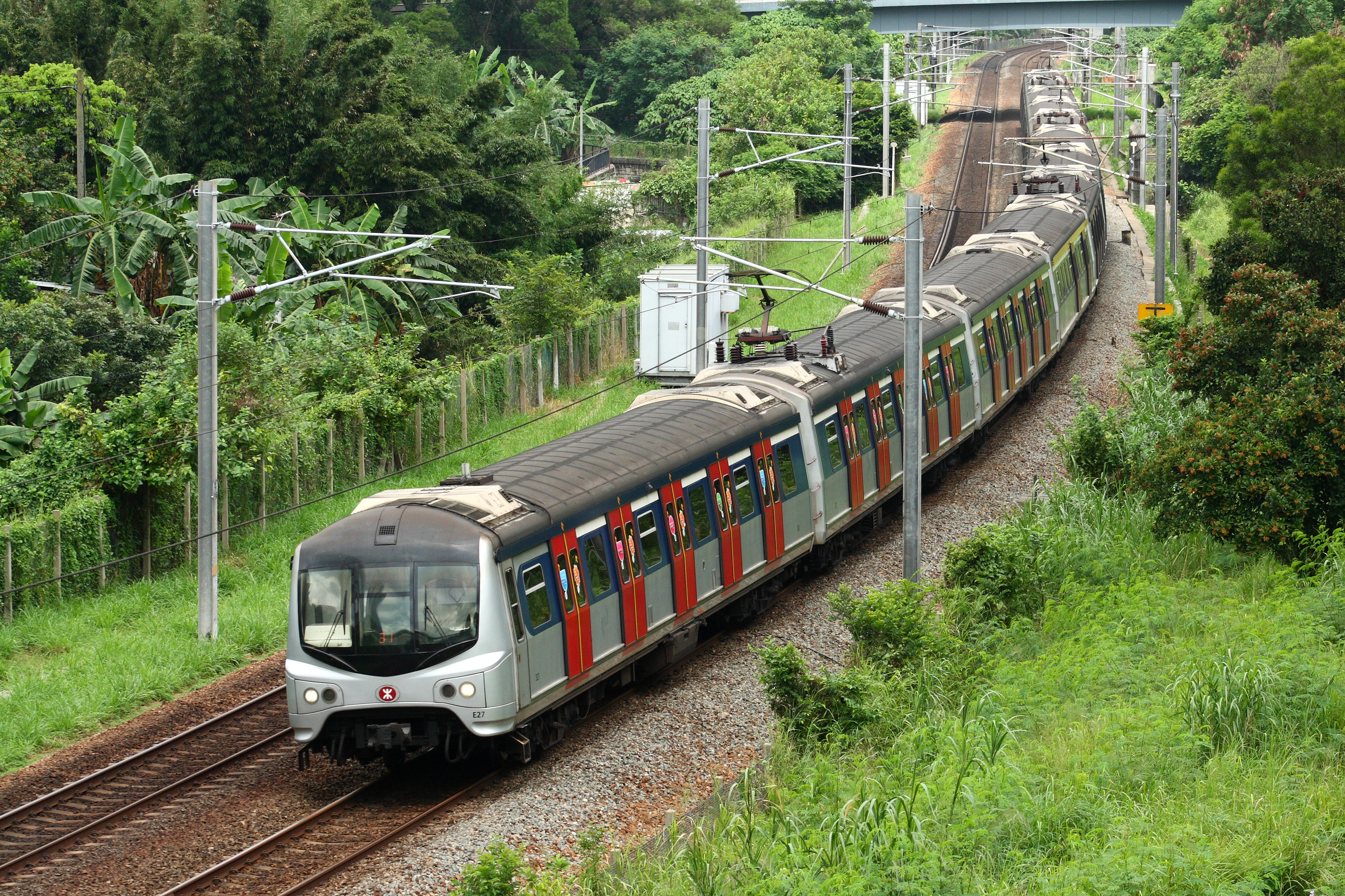
MTR East Rail Metro Cammell EMU (as refurbished 1996–1999)

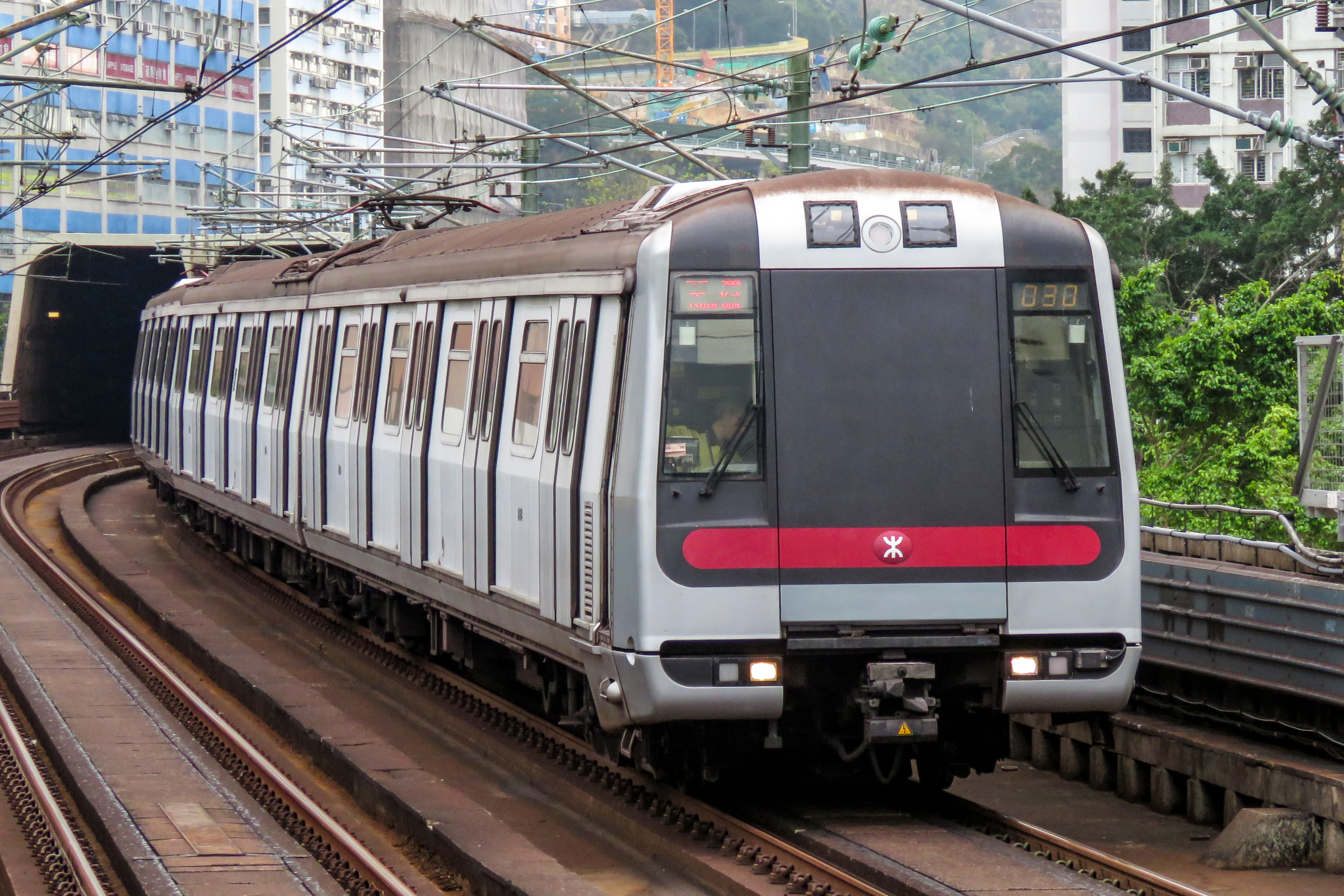
MTR Metro Cammell EMU (as refurbished 1998–2001)

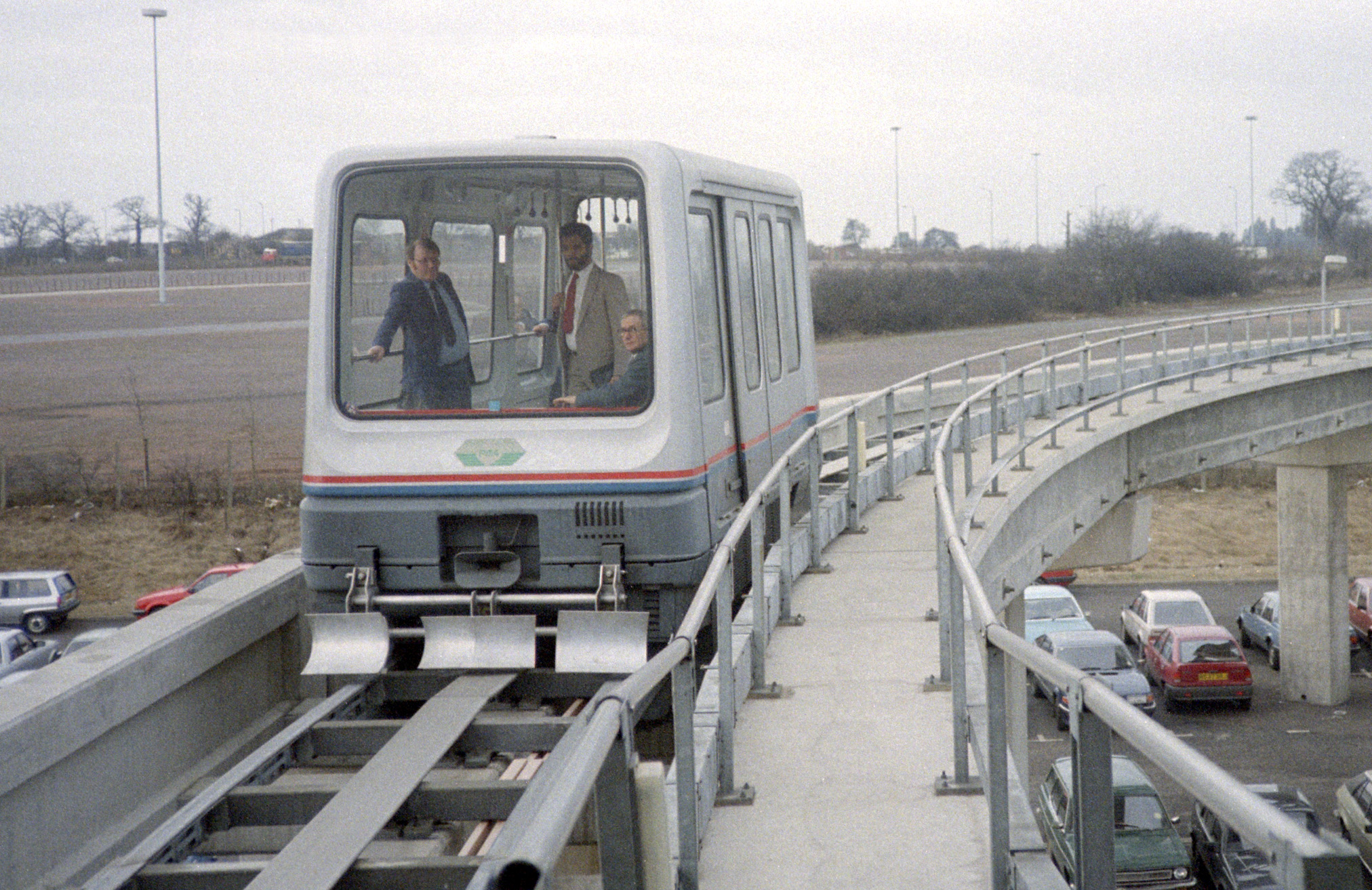
The Birmingham International maglev shuttle 1984–1995

=== Heavy rail ===
- Southern Railway "Brighton Belle" EMU
- Southern Railway "Crystal Palace" EMU
- Southern Railway "Coulsdon North & Sutton stock" EMU
- LNER Tyneside electric units
- LNER Shenfield line electric units (driving motors and intermediate trailers only)
- LNER Glossop line electric units (driving motors and intermediate trailers only)
- The Blue Pullman
- Metro-Cammell Lightweight "Heritage" diesel multiple unit
- British Rail Class 101 "Heritage" diesel multiple unit
- British Rail Class 111 "Heritage" diesel multiple unit
- British Rail Class 151 diesel multiple unit
- British Rail Class 156 "Super Sprinter" diesel multiple unit
- British Rail Class 230 battery electric/diesel-electric/diesel-battery electric multiple unit (Originally constructed as London Underground D78 Stock)
- British Rail Class 373 "TGV" electric multiple unit
- British Rail Class 465/2/9 "Networker" electric multiple unit
- British Rail Class 466 "Networker" electric multiple unit
- British Rail Class 483 electric multiple unit (Originally constructed as London Underground 1938 Stock)
- British Rail Class 484 electric multiple unit (Originally constructed as London Underground D78 Stock)
- British Rail Class 503 electric multiple unit
- British Rail Mark 4 coaching stock
- Arlanda Express (X3) electric multiple unit
- Via Rail Renaissance Fleet
- MTR Metro Cammell EMU (AC) (East Rail line, Hong Kong – formerly operated by Kowloon–Canton Railway, leased to MTR post-merger)

=== Rapid transit ===
==== London Underground ====
- London Underground Standard Stock (Bakerloo, Central, Piccadilly, Northern lines)
- London Underground 1935 Stock (Central line)
- London Underground 1938 Stock (Northern, Bakerloo, Piccadilly, East London and Central lines)
- London Underground R49 & R59 Stock (District line)
- London Underground 1959 Stock (Piccadilly line, then Bakerloo and Northern line)
- London Underground 1962 Stock (Central line)
- London Underground 1967 Stock (Victoria line)
- London Underground C69 and C77 Stock (Circle, District and Hammersmith & City Lines)
- London Underground 1972 Stock (Bakerloo line)
- London Underground 1973 Stock (Piccadilly line)
- London Underground D78 Stock (District line)
- London Underground 1983 Stock (Jubilee line)
- London Underground 1986 Stock (Central line)
- London Underground 1995 Stock (Northern line)
- London Underground 1996 Stock (Jubilee line)
- London Underground battery-electric locomotives

==== Other systems ====
- Second generation Glasgow Subway rolling stock (Glasgow Subway, Scotland)
- Tyne and Wear Metrocars (Tyne and Wear Metro, England)
- MTR Metro Cammell EMU (DC) (Kwun Tong line, Tsuen Wan line, Island line, Tseung Kwan O line, Disneyland Resort line, Hong Kong – operated by MTR)
- Birmingham Maglev (Birmingham International Airport – 3 carriages built, in service from 1984–1995)

== Bibliography ==
- Pullen, Richard (2007). The Landships of Lincoln (2nd ed.). Tucann. ISBN 978-1-873257-79-1.
- Pritchard, Robert; Fox, Peter; Hall, Peter (2009). British Railways Locomotives & Coaching Stock 2009. Sheffield: Platform 5 Publishing. ISBN 978-1-902336-70-1.
- Hardy, Brian (2002) [1976]. London Underground Rolling Stock (15th ed.). Harrow Weald: Capital Transport. ISBN 1-85414-263-1.
- Connor, Piers (1983). The 'R' Stock Story. Hemel Hempstead: London Underground Railway Society. ISBN 0-9508793-0-4.
