= London Underground 1995 Stock =

Type of rolling stock used on the London Underground

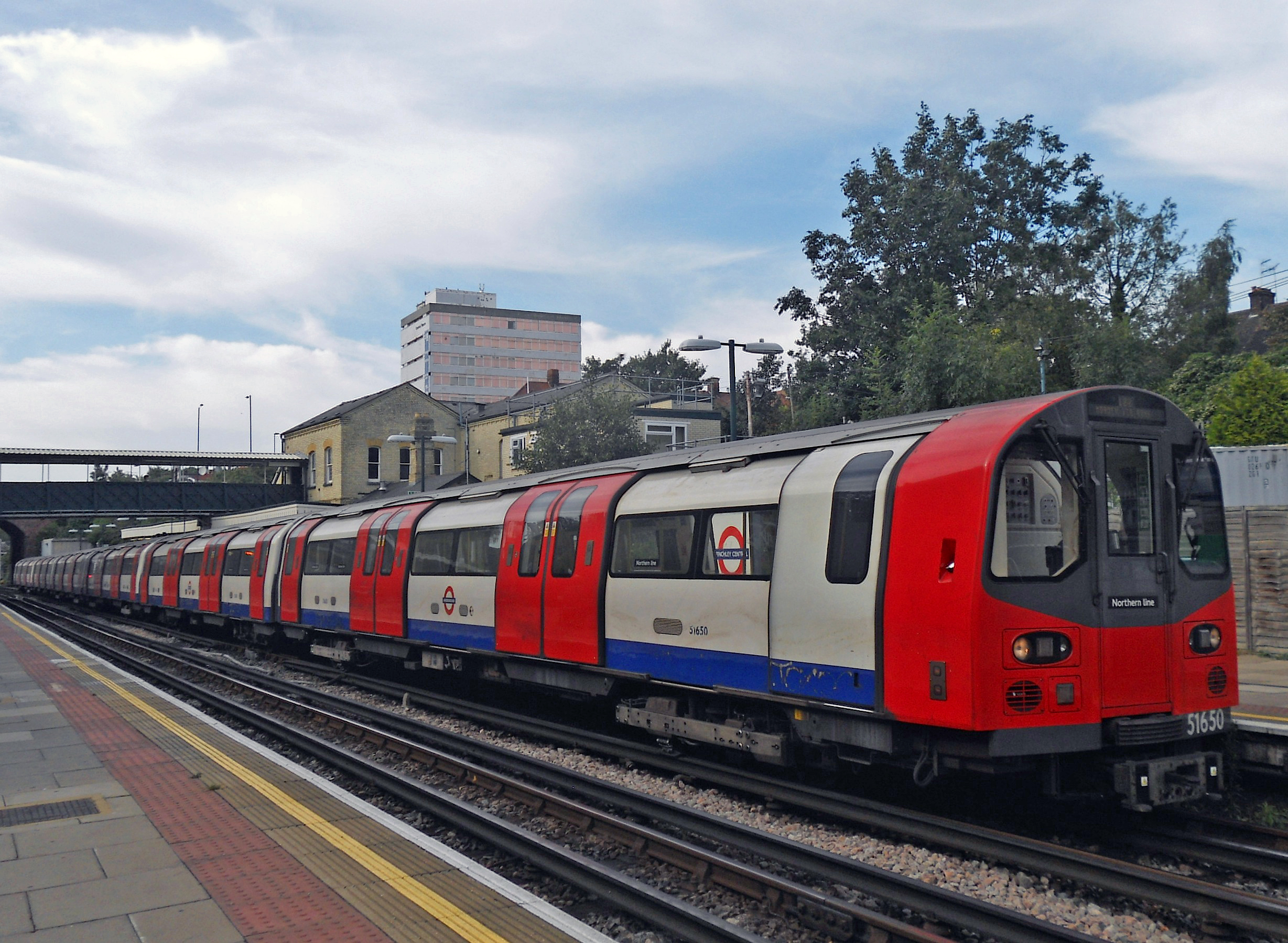
- 1995 Tube Stock train at Finchley Central
- Stock type: Deep-level tube
- In service: 12 June 1998 – present
- Manufacturers: GEC Alsthom-Metro-Cammell; Alstom
- Replaced: 1959 Stock; 1962 Stock; 1972 Stock
- Constructed: 1996–2000
- Entered service: 12 June 1998
- Refurbished: Alstom 2013–2015
- Number built: 636 cars
- Formation: 6 cars per train
- Fleet numbers: DM: 51501–686, 51701–26; T: 52501–686, 52701–26; UNDM: 53501–686, 53701–26
- Capacity: 662 (248 seats)
- Line served: Northern line

Specifications
- Train length: 108.472 m (355 ft 10.6 in)
- Car length: 18.02 m (59 ft 1 in); 18.196 m (59 ft 8.4 in) (end cars)
- Width: 2.630 m (8 ft 7.54 in)
- Height: 2.875 m (9 ft 5.19 in)
- Maximum speed: 100 km/h (62 mph)
- Weight: DM 29.4 tonnes (28.9 long tons; 32.4 short tons); UNDM 27.9 tonnes (27.5 long tons; 30.8 short tons); T 21.5 tonnes (21.2 long tons; 23.7 short tons)
- Traction system: Alstom ONIX IGBT–VVVF
- Traction motors: 3-phase AC induction motor
- Electric systems: Fourth rail, 630 V DC
- Current collection: Contact shoe
- UIC classification: Bo′Bo′+2′2′+Bo′Bo′+Bo′Bo′+2′2′+Bo′Bo′
- Bogies: Twin-transform flexible frame bogies (Adtranz)
- Safety system: Transmission Based Train Control (TBTC)

Doors opening of a train

Doors closing of a train

The London Underground 1995 Stock is a type of rolling stock used on the Northern line of the London Underground. A total of 106 six-car trains were built, entering service between June 1998 and April 2001, replacing the 1959 Stock, 1962 Stock and 1972 Stock. They are externally similar to the 1996 Stock used on the Jubilee line.

== History ==
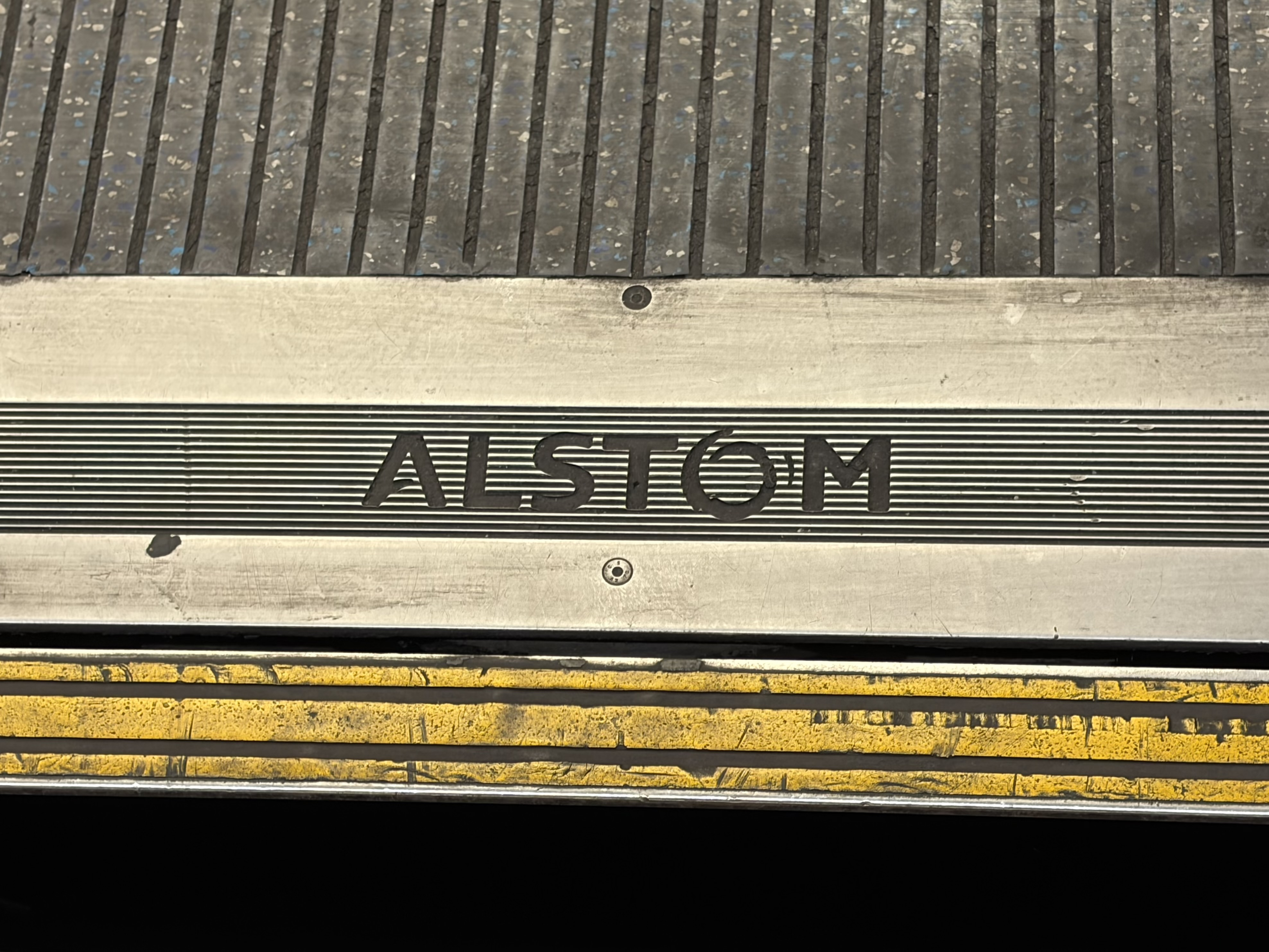
1995 Stock manufacturer’s plate

In the early 1990s, one aspect of work to comprehensively refurbish the Northern line involved the replacement of the 1959 Stock, 1962 Stock and 1972 Stock trains in use at the time. Bidders for the new trains included GEC Alsthom, Siemens, Bombardier and ABB. In December 1994, London Underground announced that GEC Alsthom (later Alstom) had won the £700 million contract. The new trains would be based on the trains under construction for the Jubilee line.

In April 1995, a Private Finance Initiative (PFI) deal worth £400m was signed between London Underground and Alstom to provide 106 six-car trains. Unlike previous rolling stock contracts on the Underground, GEC Alsthom were contracted to design, build and finance the new trains - as well as maintain the trains for at least a 20 year period (extendable to 36 years). London Underground would then pay Alstom depending on the availability and reliability of the trains.

The trains were built in Washwood Heath, Birmingham, although the bodyshells were manufactured in and imported from Spain. Construction began in 1996, with one car going on public display as part of the Lord Mayor's Show on 9 November 1996. The first train was delivered to Ruislip depot on 20 December 1996, and testing began in early 1997. The first train entered passenger service on 12 June 1998, and the final train entered service on 10 April 2001.

=== Refurbishment ===
Starting in 2013, the 1995 Stock underwent refurbishment, more than a decade after the last trains of this type entered service. Internally, new flooring was fitted, with contrasting colours in the doorways, and the yellow grab rails were re-painted dark blue. The new standard London Underground "Barman" moquette was also introduced, and wheelchair backboards were installed in the trailer cars. The external door open/close buttons were plated over, and the internal buttons were replaced by a visual door open/close warning light. The windows were polished to remove graffiti, and the external livery was re-applied.

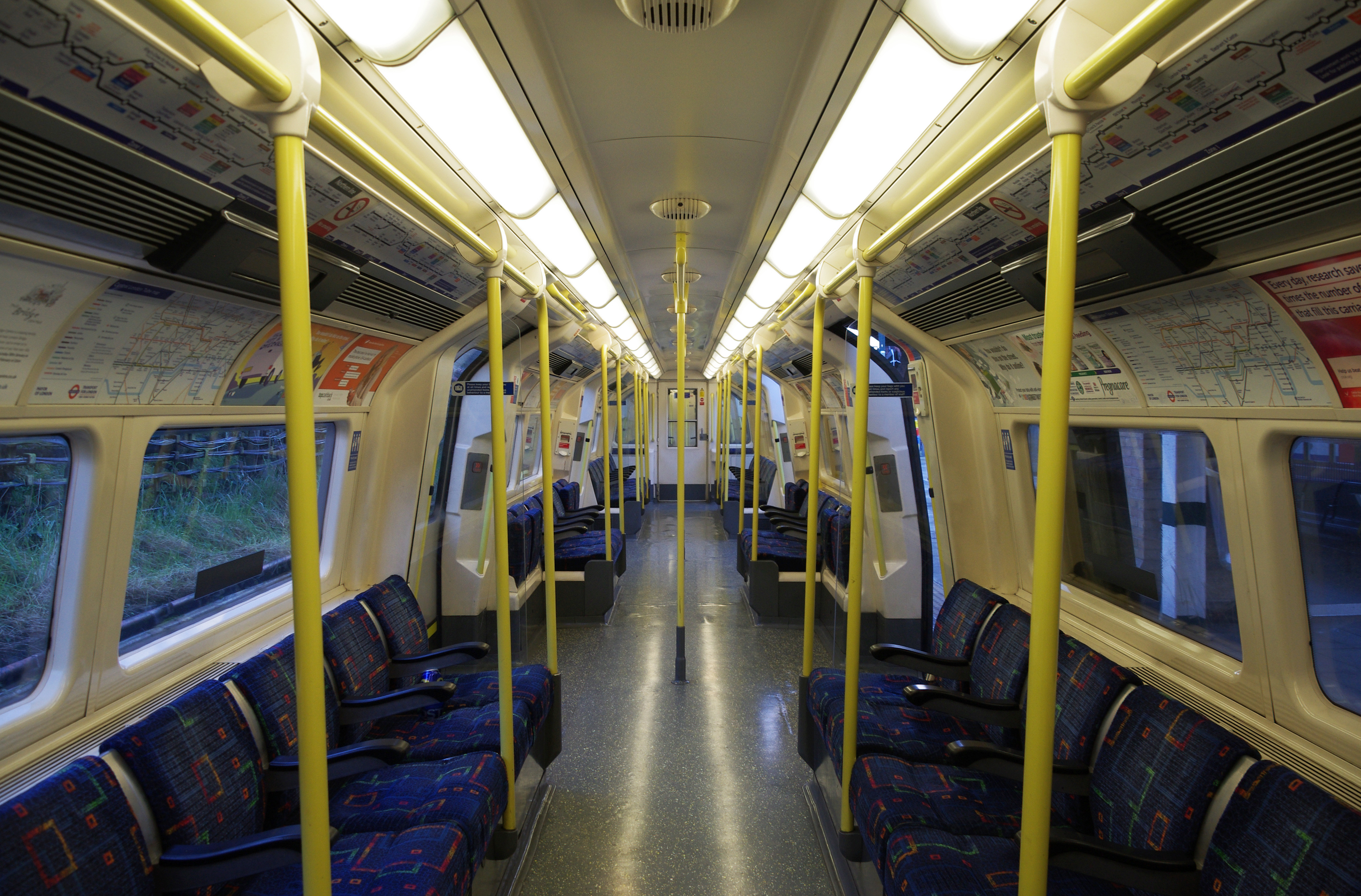
Interior before

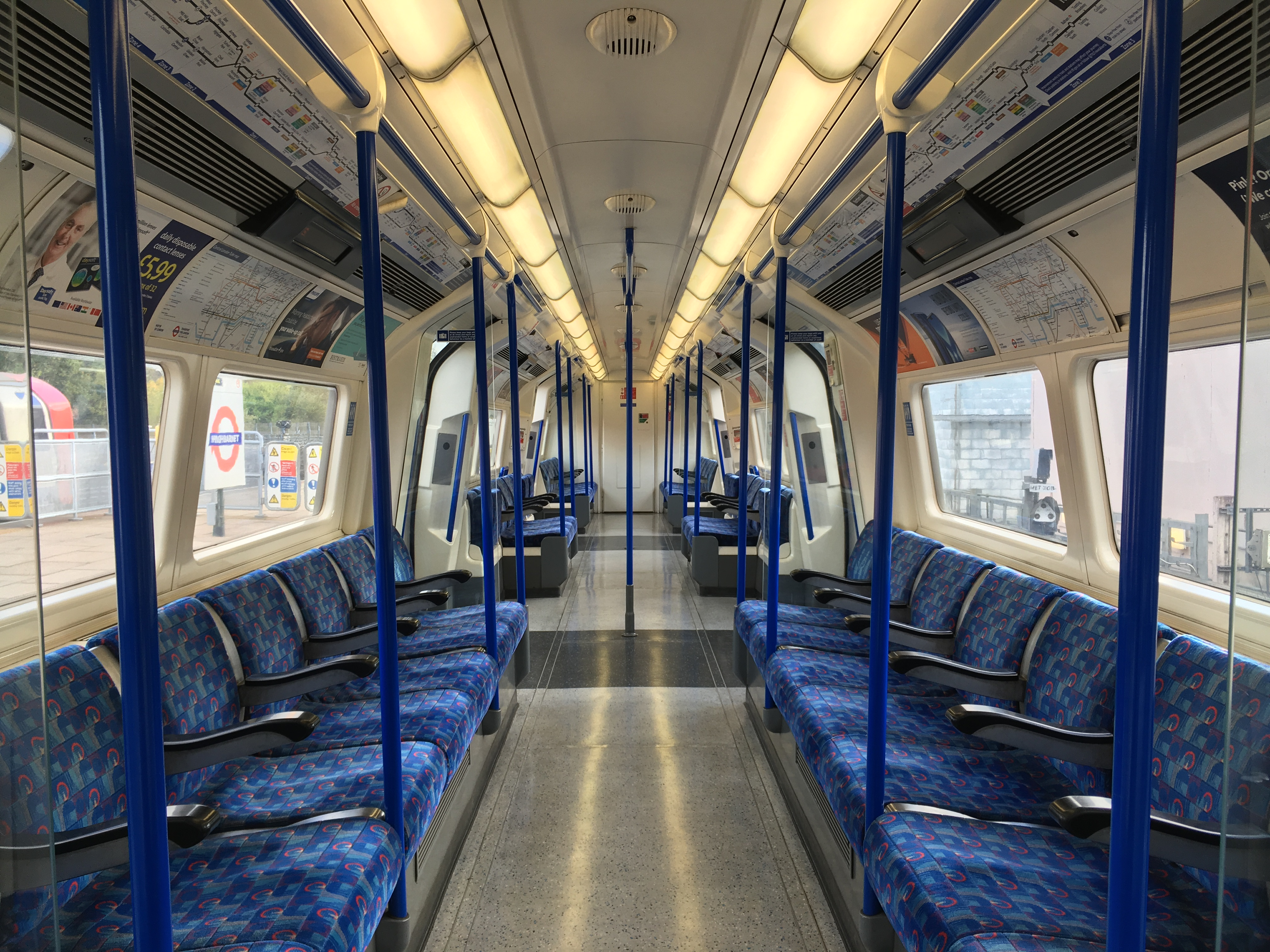
Interior after

Refurbishment of 1995 stock

The refurbishment was carried out by Alstom, and the first refurbished train entered service on 30 May 2013, and the last refurbished train had entered service by 13 April 2015. In 2015, TfL agreed to extend the PFI train maintenance contract until 2033, when the trains will be around 35 years old.

== Design ==
The 1995 Stock is very similar to the 1996 Stock used on the Jubilee line. Both trains use the same bodyshell design, and were built at the same factory at the same time. However, there are some major differences, mostly relating to the mechanical and electrical equipment. The main technical differences arose as 1996 Stock was designed for "cheapest contract cost", while 1995 Stock was designed for "life cycle cost", given Alstom's long term interest in reliability due to their PFI maintenance contract.

The most noticeable difference is the type of traction motor used. The 1996 Stock design specification was "frozen" in 1991, meaning that despite the name, the 1995 Stock actually uses more modern equipment. The 1995 stock uses Alstom's "Onix" three-phase insulated-gate bipolar transistor (IGBT) drive, whereas the 1996 stock uses three-phase induction motors fed from a single-source inverter using a gate turn-off thyristor (GTO), derived from those on Class 465/466 Networker trains. This means that, unlike the 1996 Stock, the 1995 Stock does not make the same "gear changing" noise when accelerating from rest.

Another major difference is the type of bogie used. The 1995 stock uses Adtranz bogies with air suspension to cope with the difficult track conditions of the more extensive underground sections of the Northern line, whereas the 1996 stock uses Alstom bogies with rubber suspensions.

Other differences include tip-up seats in the middle of each coach, instead of perch seats on the 1996 stock, as well the use of orange LEDs for the passenger information displays, as opposed to the red LEDs used on the 1996 stock.

Each train is made up of two three-car units, coupled together, with each unit consisting of a Driving Motor car (DM), a Trailer car (T) and an Uncoupling Non-Driving Motor car (UNDM). The six-car trains are therefore formed DM-T-UNDM+UNDM-T-DM. Some trailer cars are fitted with a de-icing tank and applicators, in order to spray de-icing fluid on the conductor rails along above-ground sections of track; these cars are marked by a small circle after their car number.

The 1995 Stock is the only deep-level tube stock to use selective door operation, necessitated by short platforms at stations such as Moorgate, Charing Cross, Hampstead and Clapham Common.

== Maintenance ==
Alstom is responsible for maintaining the trains under a PFI contract which runs until 2033. The main depot is at Golders Green, with another large depot at Morden, and two smaller depots at Highgate and Edgware.

== Diagram (Non-Refurbished) ==
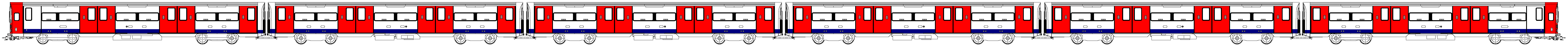

== See also ==
- London Underground 1996 Stock
