= Lillie Bridge Depot =

Traction maintenance depot

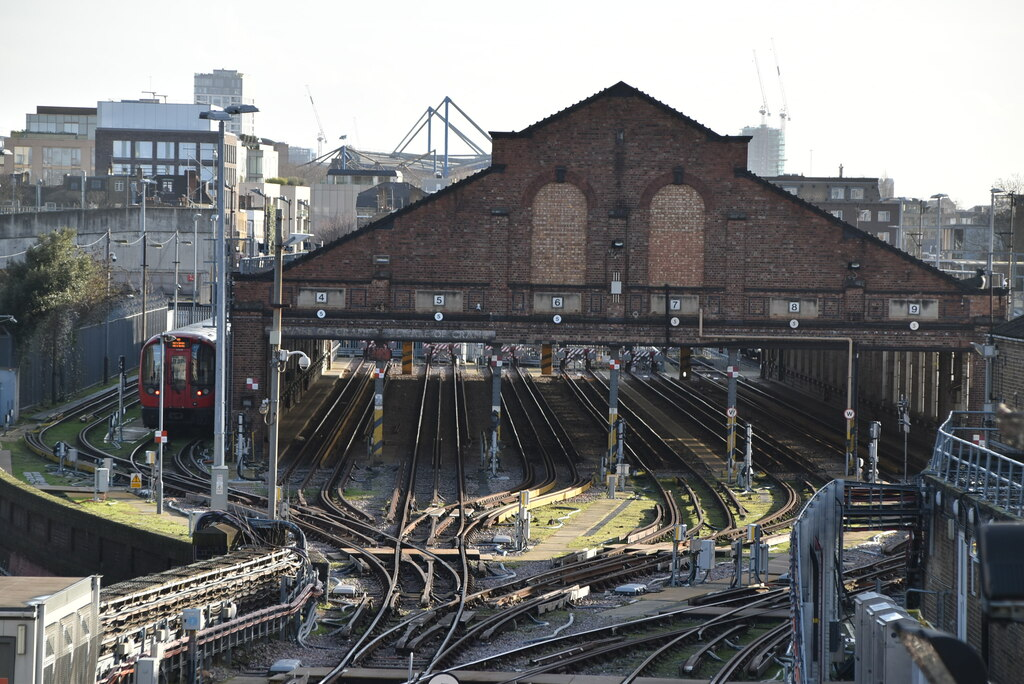
- The engine shed at Lillie Bridge works
- Interactive map of Lillie Bridge Depot

Location
- Location: Hammersmith and Fulham, United Kingdom
- Coordinates: 51.490°N 0.202°W
- OS grid: TQ249783

Characteristics
- Owner: London Underground
- Type: Tube and Sub-surface Stock

History
- Opened: 1871; 155 years ago

Lillie Bridge Depot is a historic English traction maintenance depot on the London Underground Piccadilly and District lines, situated between West Brompton and West Kensington stations in the London Borough of Hammersmith and Fulham. It is accessed from the District line tracks between Earl's Court and West Kensington or between Earl's Court and Kensington (Olympia).

The Depot was constructed in 1871, when the Metropolitan District Railway gave notice to the Metropolitan Railway, who were running their trains for them, that they would henceforth run their own trains. Lillie Bridge Depot was built on derelict land to the west of Earl's Court, to provide stabling and maintenance facilities for the District Railway's rolling stock. In 1905, the District was extended, and a new depot at Ealing Common replaced Lillie Bridge. A year later, the Great Northern, Piccadilly and Brompton Railway, later the Piccadilly line, was opened, and the depot was reconfigured to provide stabling and maintenance for their trains. Parts of it were used as a permanent way depot, until 1932, when extensions to the Piccadilly line created a new depot at Northfields, and the site was purely used by engineering departments. It was reconfigured at this time, and again in 1962 and 1987. It housed a flash butt welding plant for producing long welded rails between 1937 and the completion of the Victoria line, when this facility was transferred to Ruislip depot. Subsequently, it was used for maintenance of London Underground's fleet of battery locomotives.

Although the District Railway ceased to use steam locomotives for passenger workings in 1905, two were kept at Lillie Bridge for shunting duties. From the 1940s, all of London Underground's steam locomotives were maintained at the depot, after facilities at Neasden Depot were closed, and this continued until the last steam locomotives were withdrawn in 1971. A pioneering electro-diesel locomotive spent long periods at the depot from 1940, undergoing repairs, and after the demise of steam, the works shunter was an 0-6-0 diesel hydraulic machine obtained from Thomas Hill of Rotherham. Its use was restricted, due to its short wheelbase and axle loading.

The Depot is scheduled to be decommissioned by 2024 by Transport for London, as part of an Earl's Court regeneration scheme. Engineering facilities will be moved to Acton Works, and it will be replaced by stabling for twelve S7 Stock trains at a lower level, with redevelopment taking place above it. The scheme has not been universally popular, attracting criticism from the Mayor of London, the current Hammersmith and Fulham Council, local housing associations and residents.

== History ==
The Metropolitan District Railway opened its first section of route from South Kensington to Westminster on 24 December 1868. It did not at the time need depot facilities, because the service was worked by the Metropolitan Railway, using their own stock, who received 55 per cent of the receipts. This level of remuneration was tied to a particular service level, and if the Company wanted to run more trains, it had to pay more to the Metropolitan Railway. The District was extended on 12 April 1869, when the section from Gloucester Road via Earl's Court to West Brompton was opened. The Company disliked the arrangement with the Metropolitan Railway, and gave them notice that they wanted to run their own trains, which they did from 3 July 1871. To the west of Earl's Court station there was some former agricultural land, which was by then derelict, but was sometimes used as a site for a fairground. This land was used as the site for Lillie Bridge Depot, where the trains could be stabled and serviced. John Fowler, the engineer, pioneered the use of concrete in construction, and the sheds were probably the largest buildings with concrete walls to have been built at the time. Lighting of the carriages was by compressed oil-gas, which was stored in wrought iron cylinders mounted on the underframes. A gas producing plant was constructed at Lillie Bridge, and the gas was transported during the night to various points around the system. Access was by a junction on the Earl's Court to Olympia tracks, and required trains to reverse up a slope to reach the depot.

The District extension from Turnham Green to Ealing Broadway was opened on 1 July 1879. It included a station named Mill Hill Park, which was renamed Acton Town in 1910. A new depot at Mill Hill Park was completed in 1905, as part of the electrification works for the District Railway, and the engineering functions were moved from Lillie Bridge to Mill Hill Park, which became known as Ealing Common Depot. In 1906, the Great Northern, Piccadilly and Brompton Railway opened, running from Finsbury Park to Hammersmith, with its engineering offices headquartered from 1907 in the neo Georgian building that is currently 16-18 Empress Place. Empress Place was originally called Richmond Place, and development took place in 1864–65 to the designs of the architect John Young, while the Piccadilly line engineering headquarters were purpose-built in 1907. It was a tube railway, but reached the surface just to the west of West Kensington station. The concrete building was demolished, and new car sheds were constructed at the depot, long enough to hold three of the six-car Piccadilly trains, which reached the depot by using the District tracks. At the rear end of the sheds there was a lifting shop. When the number of tracks to Acton Town was increased from two to four in 1932, as part of the Piccadilly line extensions, a new depot for Piccadilly line trains was built at Northfields, and Lillie Bridge ceased to be used for stabling trains.

=== Permanent Way depot ===
After the departure of District trains, parts of the depot were redeveloped as a permanent way facility. The organisation of the site was haphazard, and the facilities were primitive, but the location was well-placed, enabling works trains to reach most parts of the system relatively easily. The site had acquired a building made of corrugated iron, which housed the stores and machine shops. There was an area where crossings were laid out, and other areas where sleepers, rails and fittings were stored. The sidings and marshalling tracks left behind after the District Railway moved their works were used to assemble engineering trains, before they were dispatched onto the network. One problem with the site was that it was hemmed in by railways and built-up property, which meant that there was no prospect of extending it. London Underground considered relocating the works on several occasions, either to give the engineers more room, or later, because property developers were keen to buy the site, but on each occasion, that option was rejected because the location suited its use so well.

A major reconstruction of the site took place in 1931–32, which was complicated by the fact that the depot was supporting a large new-works programme at the time, and so needed to remain operational throughout the rebuilding process. The track layout was entirely reworked, and concrete roads were installed. Space for the overhaul of signalling equipment and other permanent way work was provided by a new workshop and stores building, while a 10-ton Goliath crane with a reach of 100 feet (30 m) enabled anything in the stacking area and the crossing makers yard to be moved around as required. The improvements made were intended as the first of three stages, but subsequent development was not carried out because of the costs.

London Underground pioneered the use of flash butt welded rail in the United Kingdom. Engineers, investigating the use of such techniques in 1936, found that the German State Railways had been using welded rails since 1928, so in 1937 a welding machine was bought from AEG in Germany, and installed at Lillie Bridge. It was used intensively until 1946, and was supplemented by a mobile machine which was mounted on a wagon. The welder had been specially made by the AI Electric Welding Appliance Company at Inverness in 1938, and they supplied a new machine for Lillie Bridge when the original AEG welder was scrapped in 1946. The depot produced long welded rails for use throughout the underground network, but also produced rails for British Rail, until they bought their own welding machines in 1947. The welding plant was installed inside the disused Piccadilly car sheds.

In 1962, further reorganisation took place, when new offices were built to accommodate the overhaul of signals. The project also saw the introduction of a new canteen, carpenters' shop and plant shop. When the Victoria line was being constructed, a new rail welding machine was purchased from the Swiss company H A Schlatter, and installed at Northumberland Park depot. Once the line was opened from Walthamstow Central to Victoria, the new machine was moved to Ruislip depot, where a new welding plant was set up, and the Lillie Bridge plant was closed. This enabled the Piccadilly buildings to be repurposed as a maintenance facility for battery locomotives and a welding shop for the production of track equipment. Again, the track layout was improved, to make the marshalling of works trains easier.

The whole site occupies around 15 acres (6.1 ha). Prior to 1935, the site was flanked to the east and the west by Earl's Court exhibition grounds, with a bridge crossing over the car shed to join the two sections. Work began on the Earls Court Exhibition Centre in 1935, and it opened in 1937. As part of that work, the southern end of the depot site was covered with a raft, which eventually became the base for Earl's Court Two, a second exhibition building opened in 1991. A major section of the Piccadilly car sheds was demolished at some point, as they were considerably shorter in 1951 than they were in 1916, the rear two-thirds having been removed. Some further redevelopment of the site took place in 1987, as part of the Earls Court Two project.

=== Rolling stock ===
Both the Metropolitan Railway and the District Railway were looking at electrification of their lines by the late 1890s, to eliminate the nuisance of smoke from steam locomotives. In 1898 they decided to conduct a joint experiment, and to run an electric train on the tracks between High Street Kensington and Earl's Court. They purchased a new six-car train for the trials, after considering the conversion of existing stock, and in May 1899 an order was placed with Brown, Marshalls & Company, who fulfilled the order just four months later. The train was delivered to Lillie Bridge, where Siemens Bros installed the electrical equipment. After preliminary trials from 9 December 1899, the train was used in public service from 14 May to 6 November 1900, and formed the basis for electrification plans for both railways.

In addition to the passenger stock for the District line until 1905 and for the Piccadilly line from 1906 to 1932, the depot has been the base for a number of service vehicles. The last steam passenger working on the District line was on 5 November 1905, and 48 locomotives were sold for scrap. Six were kept, but by 1909, only two were still operational, and were used for shunting at Lillie Bridge, and working in Kensington goods yard. Kensington goods yard was situated immediately to the west of the depot, and was accessed by a separate curve which joined the District line tracks beyond West Kensington station. The operational locomotives were numbered 33 and 34, but No.33 was scrapped in 1925, and was replaced by a similar locomotive, bought from the Metropolitan Railway, which became No.35. They continued to perform shunting duties at Lillie Bridge until 1932. They were replaced by two new locomotives ordered from the Hunslet Engine Company in Leeds. They were 0-6-0 side tanks, and were numbered L30 and L31, the first London Underground steam locomotives to carry the "L" prefix. In addition to shunting at Lillie Bridge, they were used to move stores from the depot to Acton Works and Ealing Common depot, and occasionally took ballast trains to East Ham.

Under the 1935-40 New Works programme, Neasden Depot became stabling facilities for electric passenger stock, and steam locomotives for passenger working were provided by the London and North Eastern Railway. Basic facilities for the small fleet of steam locomotives retained for maintenance work were provided at Neasden, but Lillie Bridge became responsible for the heavy maintenance of all remaining steam locomotives. London Underground retained three steam locomotives until 1971, which were used to convey steel tyres and other heavy materials between Lillie Bridge and Acton Works until February 1971. The last working trip was on 4 June 1971, when L90 left Lillie Bridge with a crane, bound for Neasden, but failed at Harrow, when its fusible plug blew, and it had to be rescued by battery locomotives. The official end of steam was two days later. For a number of years in the 1920s and 1930s, the depot was also the home of a preserved electric locomotive from the City and South London Railway. No.26 was eventually mounted on a plinth at Moorgate station but was badly damaged in an air raid in 1940 and was subsequently scrapped.

In 1940, London Underground built an experimental electro-diesel locomotive, using two Central London Railway motor cars. Although it was never based at Lillie Bridge, it spent considerable periods at the depot, being repaired. There were several problems with it, some of which were caused by crews not being familiar with the controls. It was not a success, and was not used after 1956. A diesel-electric shunter was borrowed from British Rail in October 1954, and tested at both Lillie Bridge and Neasden, to see if it would be a suitable alternative to steam locomotives, but in the event, further steam locomotives were bought from the Western Region. When the final three steam locomotives were withdrawn in 1971, they were replaced by three 0-6-0 diesel hydraulic locomotives obtained from Thomas Hill of Rotherham. One was allocated to Lillie Bridge and another to Neasden, with the third acting as a spare. Unfortunately, the wheelbase was only 9 feet (2.7 m), and this was too short to operate the track signalling correctly, so they were confined to working in the two depots. To overcome this, each was permanently coupled to a tender, to increase the wheelbase to 28.5 feet (8.7 m). Even with this modification, they saw limited use outside of Lillie Bridge and Neasden, as their axle loading prevented them from crossing various bridges on the system.

=== Redevelopment ===
In 2008, with the election of a Conservative Mayor of London, plans were drawn up for the redevelopment of the Earls Court Exhibition Centre site, including Lillie Bridge depot and other surrounding land, covering an area of 44 acres (18 ha). Outline planning consent was granted to the redevelopment "masterplan" by the adjacent Conservative-controlled local authorities in November 2013, and Transport for London made an agreement with Capital and Counties PLC (Capco) to carry out the redevelopment of Earls Court exhibition halls 1 and 2, including Lillie Bridge Depot, as a joint venture, ECPL (Earls Court Properties Limited). Transport for London had been looking at options for the depot since 2010, and had reached the conclusion that the workshops could be relocated to Acton Works, with the Transplant maintenance facilities moving to Ruislip depot. However, there was still a need for stabling of trains at the site, and the intention is to construct a low-level box beneath the new buildings for this purpose. Ashfield House, which has provided office accommodation on the northern edge of the depot site, and since 2010 contained a realistic mock-up of a tube station for staff training purposes, known as West Ashfield tube station, is also to be vacated, with staff redeployed elsewhere, so that the building can be demolished. The consequent reconfiguration of Acton Works may require the Emergency Response Unit to relocate from there to another site.

Following reports in November 2018 that the developers were in talks to sell most of their stake in the giant scheme to a Hong Kong billionaire, the stalemate with Hammersmith and Fulham Council deepened. In February 2019 news emerged that the council was considering a compulsory purchase order for the site to increase the amount and accelerate the delivery of badly needed affordable housing.

As of 2014, the site was used for the stabling of up to ten S7 Stock trains, with three sidings used by Transplant for the stabling of maintenance trains. Departments located at the site were the Maintenance Infrastructure Services, the Track Manufacturing Division, the Track Delivery Unit, Plant Services, which covers workshops and stores, and the site also provided storage facilities for Transplant. Transplant maintenance facilities were in the process of being moved to Ruislip depot. London Underground initially thought that stabling for ten trains would be sufficient, but this was increased to 12, to allow for possible changes in service patterns, and the stabling of an engineering train, such as a rail grinder or a battery locomotive with wagons. Various other locations had been considered for the stabling of trains, but all were ruled out on the grounds of cost and associated risks.

The new stabling box would provide six stabling tracks, each capable of holding two S7 Stock trains. They would be numbered from 1 to 6, from east to west. The facility to allow road-rail vehicles to drive onto the tracks could not be accommodated, and diesel trains would be excluded from using the site because of ventilation problems. In addition, the presence of an engineering train, which may be up to 456 feet (139 m) long, would reduce the number of S7 Stock trains that could use the facility to ten.

In order to allow the development to take place, a number of buildings of architectural interest on Empress Place, including the former Piccadilly line (1907) engineering headquarters at Nos. 16–18, (currently, Capco's Project Rooms) and other Victorian retail outlets on nearby Lillie Road have been given a certificate of immunity by Historic England, which prevents them being granted listed building status. The certificate commenced on 13 January 2017, and runs for five years. The redevelopment scheme has not been universally popular, with aspects of it being criticised by Sadiq Khan, the Mayor of London. Control of Hammersmith and Fulham Council changed in 2014 from Conservative to Labour, who were unhappy with the deal they inherited, and the housing associations for the two council estates that are due to be demolished continued to oppose the plans, as did the RMT union, who represent workers at the depot, and the Save Earl's Court campaign, a local pressure group.

== Gallery ==
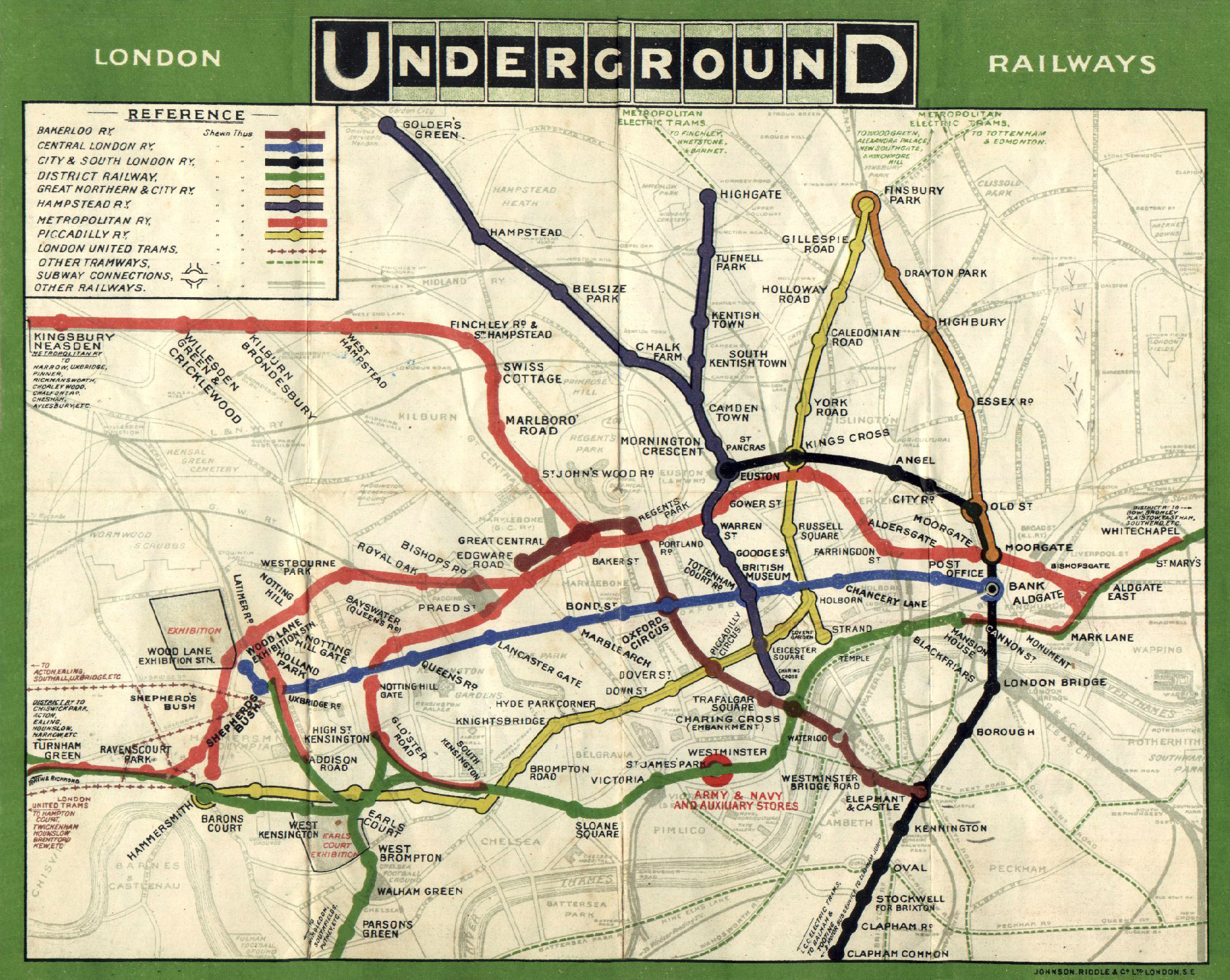
Tube map from 1908 showing the variety of railway companies

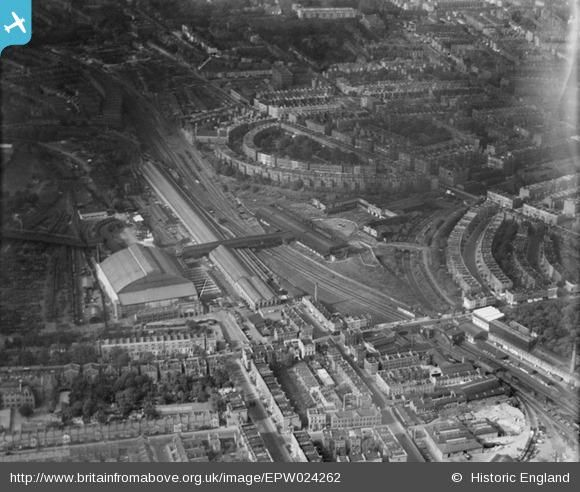
Aerial view of Lillie Bridge Depot in 1928

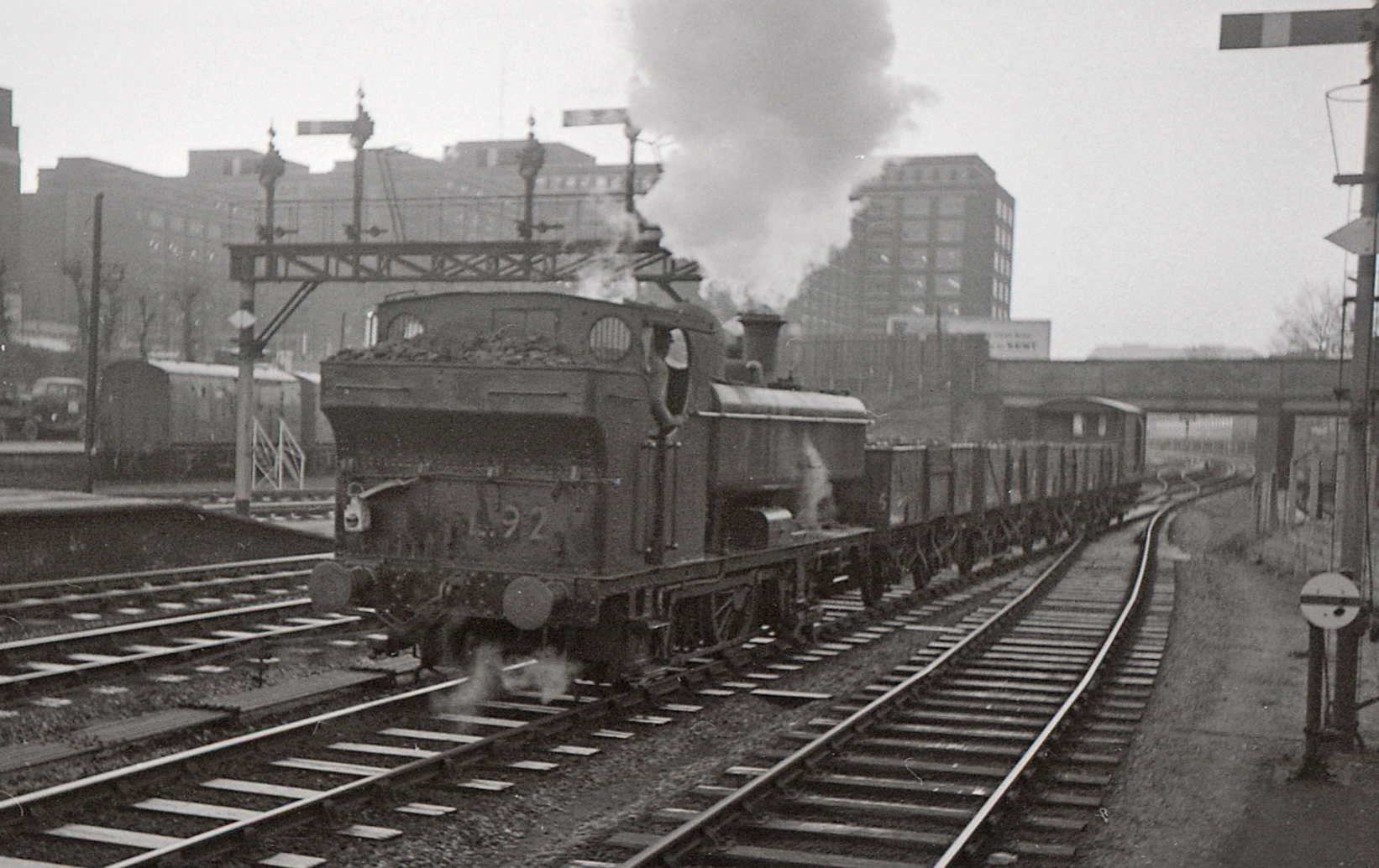
L92 steaming towards Lillie Bridge Depot in 1968

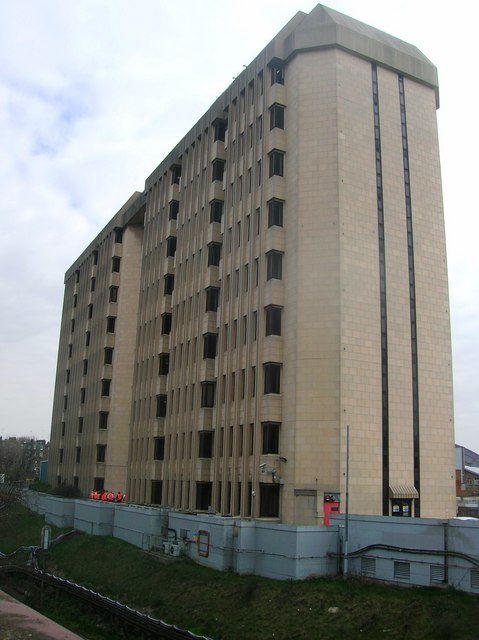
Ashfield House, West Kensington, site of the virtual Tube station

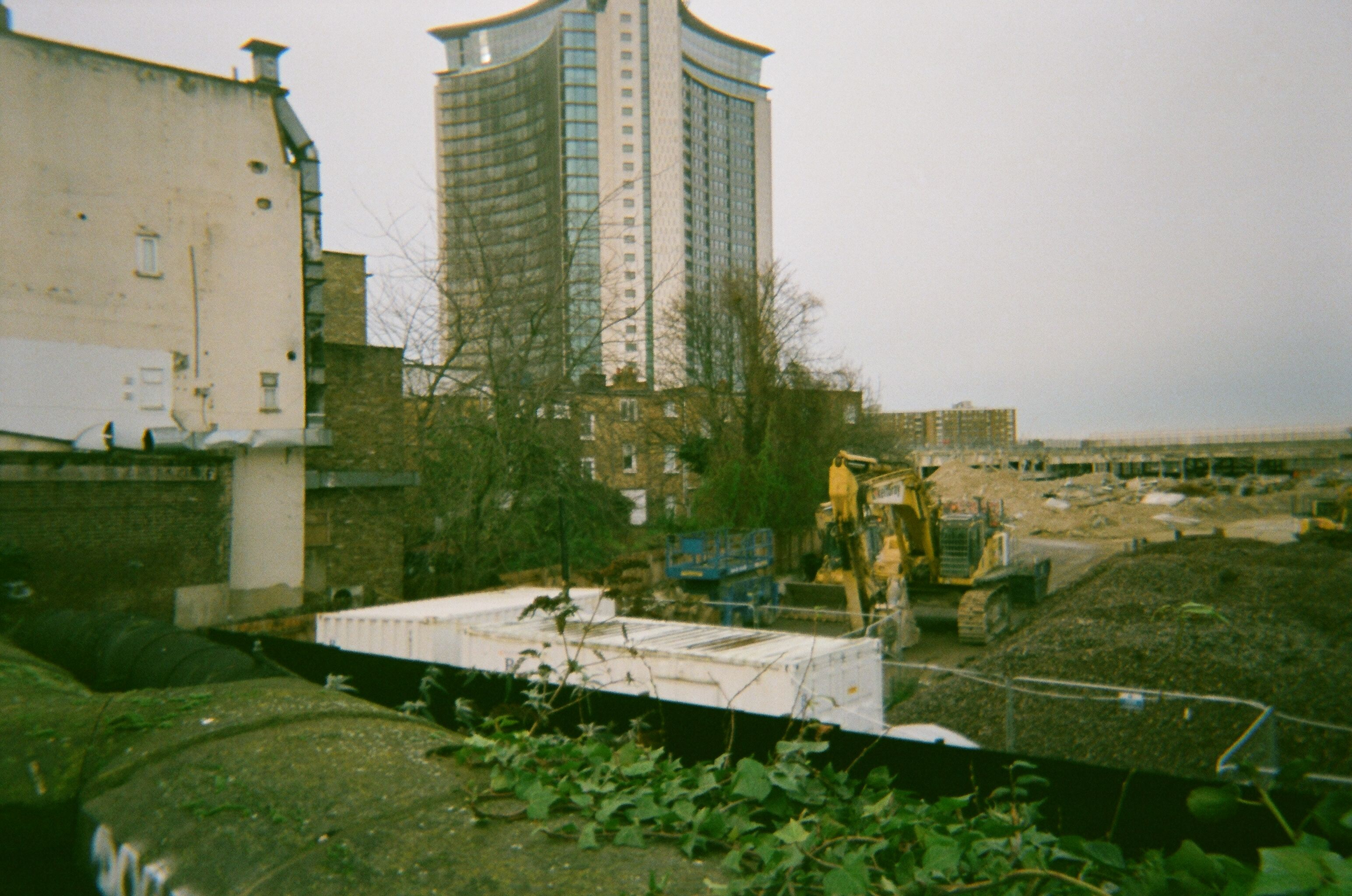
the partially demolished Depot viewed from Lillie Bridge in 2015

== See also ==
- Charles Yerkes
- Albert Stanley, 1st Baron Ashfield#Legacy
- London General Omnibus Company
