= List of London Transport locomotives =

In 1933, London's underground railways, tramway companies and bus operators merged to form the London Passenger Transport Board (LPTB), commonly known as London Transport. London Transport numbered all of its service stock locomotives into one unified series, regardless of the type.

| Numbers | Built | Builder | Type | Use | Notes |
|---|---|---|---|---|---|
| L1–L7 | 1905 | MAR&W | B-B | Ealing-Southend through trains | |
| L8–L9 | 1909 | Renshaw | B-B | Acton-Ealing stores ferries | rebuilt from District Railway (DR) battery locomotives |
| L10 | 1907/1930 | AC&F/UERL | B-B | Acton Works yard shunter | ex-CCE&H motors 1 & 3 |
| L11–L12 | | | B-B | battery locomotives | ex-tube gate stock |
| L13–L20 | | | B-B | ballast motors | ex-tube gate stock |
| L21 | | | B-B | Wood Lane yard shunter | ex-Central London Railway (CLR) |
| L24–L29 | | | B-B | service motors | ex-tube gate stock |
| L32 | | | B-B | battery locomotive | ex-tube gate stock |
| L33 | | | B-B | Drayton Park yard shunter | ex-Great Northern & City Railway 21 ex-Metropolitan Railway (MET) 1 |
| L34 | 1922 | KS&C | 0-4-2ST | Epping-Ongar shuttle | tube loading gauge; ex-Underground Electric Railways of London (UERL) "Brazil" |
| L35–L43 | 1936-37 | GRCW | B-B | battery locomotives | L35 preserved at London Transport Museum (LTM); Metadyne equipped installed in L41–L43, 1938 |
| L44 | 1896 | MET | 0-4-4T | | ex-MET 1 |
| L45 | 1866 | BP&C | 4-4-0T | | ex-MET 23; renumbered 23 and preserved at LTM |
| L46 | 1896 | MET | 0-4-4T | | ex-MET 77 |
| L47 | 1900 | MET | 0-4-4T | | ex-MET 80 |
| L48 | 1901 | HL | 0-4-4T | | ex-MET 81 |
| L49–L52 | 1901 | YEC | 0-6-2T | | ex-MET 90-93 |
| L53 | 1897 | PECK | 0-6-0ST | | ex-MET 101 |
| L54 | 1899 | PECK | 0-6-0ST | | ex-MET 102 |
| L55–L57 | 1951 | PICK | B-B | battery locomotives | |
| L58–L61 | 1952 | PICK | B-B | battery locomotives | |
| L62 | 1965 | M-C | B-B | battery locomotive | |
| L63 | 1923/1954 | CL/LPTB | B-B | ballast motor | ex-Standard stock DM 3463 |
| L64 | 1923/1955 | MC&W/LPTB | B-B | ballast motor | ex-Standard stock DM 3500 |
| L65 | 1923/1954 | CL/LPTB | B-B | ballast motor | ex-Standard stock DM 3453 |
| L68 | 1923/1954 | MC&W/LPTB | B-B | ballast motor | ex-Standard stock DM 3494 |
| L69–L70 | 1923/1954 | MC&W/LPTB | B-B | ballast motors | ex-Standard stock DMs |
| L71 | 1923/1954 | MC&W/LPTB | B-B | ballast motor | ex-Standard stock DM 3507 |
| L72 | 1923/1954 | MC&W/LPTB | B-B | ballast motor | ex-Standard stock DM |
| L73 | 1923/1954 | MC&W/LPTB | B-B | ballast motor | ex-Standard stock DM; replaced by L77, 1967 |
| L74 | 1923/1954 | MC&W/LPTB | B-B | ballast motor | ex-Standard stock DM 3506 |
| L75 | 1923/1954 | MC&W/LPTB | B-B | ballast motor | ex-Standard stock DM 3517 |
| L76 | 1962 | LPTB | B-B | battery locomotive | renumbered L33, 1974 |
| L77 | 1931/1967 | M-C/LPTB | B-B | ballast motor | ex-Standard stock DM 3183 |
| DL81–DL82 | 1968 | RR | 0-6-0 | Neasden/Lillie Bridge shunters | see Diesel locomotives |
| DL83 | 1967 | RR | 0-6-0 | Neasden/Lillie Bridge shunter | see Diesel locomotives |
| L84/L85 | 1983/1986 | M-B | B | Unimog road/rail shunter | see Diesel locomotives |
| L89 | 1929 | | 0-6-0PT | | ex-Great Western Railway (GWR) 5775, 1948; ex-British Railways (BR) 5775, 1963; preserved at Keighley & Worth Valley Railway (Yorkshire) |
| L90 | 1930 | | 0-6-0PT | | ex-GWR 7711, 1948; ex-BR 7711, 1957 |
| L90 (2nd) | 1930 | | 0-6-0PT | | ex-GWR 7760, 1948; ex-BR 7760, 1961; preserved at Birmingham Railway Museum (Birmingham) |
| L91 | 1929 | | 0-6-0PT | | ex-GWR 5752, 1948; ex-BR 5752, 1958 |
| L91 (2nd) | 1929 | | 0-6-0PT | | ex-GWR 5757, 1948; ex-BR 5757, 1960 |
| L92 | 1929 | | 0-6-0PT | | ex-GWR 5786, 1948; ex-BR 5786, 1958 |
| L93 | 1930 | | 0-6-0PT | | ex-GWR 7779, 1948; ex-BR 7779, 1959 |
| L94 | 1930 | | 0-6-0PT | | ex-GWR 7752, 1948; ex-BR 7752, 1960 |
| L95 | 1929 | | 0-6-0PT | | ex-GWR 5764, 1948; ex-BR 5764, 1960; preserved at Severn Valley Railway (Bridgnorth) |
| L96 | 1930 | | 0-6-0PT | | ex-GWR 7741, 1948; ex-BR 7741, 1961 |
| L97 | 1930 | | 0-6-0PT | | ex-GWR 7749, 1948; ex-BR 7749, 1962 |
| L98 | 1930 | | 0-6-0PT | | ex-GWR 7739, 1948; ex-BR 7739, 1962 |
| L99 | 1930 | | 0-6-0PT | | ex-GWR 7715, 1948; ex-BR 7715, 1963; preserved at Buckinghamshire Railway Centre (Buckinghamshire) |
| L11 | 1931/1964 | M-C/LPTB | B-B | Acton Works yard shunter | ex-Standard stock DM 3080/3109; preserved by London Underground Ltd. (LUL) |
| L13A–L13B | 1938/1974 | M-C/LTE | B-B+B-B | Acton Works shunter | ex-1938 DM 10130/11130 |
| L14A–L14B | 1937/69-70 | M-C/LPTB/LTE | | Acton Works shunter | articulated; ex-1935 DM 10011/11011, 1972 |
| L15–L16 | 1970 | M-C | B-B | battery locomotives | |
| L17–L19 | 1971 | M-C | B-B | battery locomotives | |
| L20–L21 | 1964 | M-C | B-B | battery locomotives | |
| L22–L32 | 1965 | M-C | B-B | battery locomotives | L25-L32 equipped with cab signalling |
| L30–L31 | 1931 | HUNS | 0-6-0T | District works trains | ex-DR |
| L32 | | | B-B | battery locomotive | ex-tube gate stock |
| L33 | 1962 | LPTB | | battery locomotive | ex-L76, 1974 |
| L44–L54 | 1974 | BREL | B-B | battery locomotives | |
| L63–L65 | 1985 | M-C | B-B | battery locomotives | |
| L66–L67 | 1986 | M-C | B-B | battery locomotives | |
| ESL100 | 1903/1938 | BRCW/LPTB | B-4-4-B | electric sleet locomotive | ex-3960/3985; ex-CLR motors |
| ESL101 | 1903/1939 | MC&W BRCW/LPTB | B-4-4-B | electric sleet locomotive | ex-3958/3983; ex-CLR motors |
| ESL102 | 1903/1939 | BRCW/LPTB | B-4-4-B | electric sleet locomotive | ex-3990/3997; ex-CLR motors |
| ESL103 | 1903/1939 | | B-4-4-B | electric sleet locomotive | ex-CLR motors |
| ESL104 | 1903/1939 | BRCW/LPTB | B-4-4-B | electric sleet locomotive | ex-3971/3980; ex-CLR motors |
| ESL105 | 1903/1939 | MC&W BRCW/LPTB | B-4-4-B | electric sleet locomotive | ex-3952/3965; ex-CLR motors |
| ESL106 | 1903/1939 | BRCW/LPTB | B-4-4-B | electric sleet locomotive | ex-3984/3993; ex-CLR motors |
| ESL107 | 1903/1939 | MC&W BRCW/LPTB | B-4-4-B | electric sleet locomotive | ex-3944/3981; ex-CLR motors; preserved at LTM |
| ESL108 | 1903/1939 | BRCW/LPTB | B-4-4-B | electric sleet locomotive | ex-3989/3992; ex-CLR motors |
| ESL109–ESL110 | 1903/1940 | | B-4-4-B | electric sleet locomotive | ex-CLR motors |
| ESL111–ESL112 | 1903/1940 | MC&W/LPTB | B-4-4-B | electric sleet locomotive | ex-3956/3959 & 3945/3950; ex-CLR motors |
| ESL113–ESL114 | 1903/1940 | BRCW/LPTB | B-4-4-B | electric sleet locomotive | ex-3962/3969 & 3967/3970; ex-CLR motors |
| ESL115 | 1903/1940 | | B-4-4-B | electric sleet locomotive | ex-CLy motors |
| ESL116–ESL117 | 1903/1940 | MC&W BRCW/LPTB | B-4-4-B | electric sleet locomotive | ex-3953/3964 & 3954/3995; ex-CLR motors |
| ESL118A+ESL118B | 1932/1961 | BRCW/LPTB | B-4-4-B | electric sleet locomotive | ex-T 2758/2749; renumbered 2758/2749 and preserved at Spa Valley Railway (Tunbridge Wells) |
| L120–L129 | 1931-34 | M-C | B-B | pilot motor | ex-Standard stock DMs, 1967 |
| L130–L131 | 1934 | M-C | B-B | pilot motor | ex-Standard stock DMs 3690/3693, 1967; L 130 preserved by LUL |
| L132 | 1931-34 | M-C | B-B | pilot motor | ex-Standard stock DM, 1967 |
| L134 | 1927 | MC&W | B-B | pilot motor | ex-Standard stock DM 3370, 1967 |
| L135 | 1934 | M-C | B-B | pilot motor | ex-Standard stock DM 3701, 1967; preserved by LUL |
| DEL120 | 1942 | LPTB | B-B | | diesel-electric locomotive; ex-CLR motors |
| L126–L129 | 1938 | GRCW | B-B | pilot motor | ex-Q38 DM 4416-4419, 1971; L126-L127 renumbered 4416-4417 and preserved at LTM |
| L132–L133 | 1960/1987 | CRAV/BREL | B-B | Track Recording Car pilot motors | ex-1960 DM 3901/3905 |
| L140 | 1938 | M-C | B-B | ballast motor | ex-1938 DM 10088, 1973 |
| L141 | 1938 | M-C | B-B | ballast motor | ex-1938 DM 11067, 1975 |
| L142–L143 | 1938 | M-C | B-B | ballast motor | ex-1938 DMs 10021/10065, 1973 |
| L144–L145 | 1938 | M-C | B-B | ballast motor | ex-1938 DMs 10257/11027, 1975 |
| L146–L147 | 1938 | M-C | B-B | ballast motor | ex-1938 DMs 10034/11034, 1976 |
| L148–L149 | 1938 | M-C | B-B | ballast motor | ex-1938 DMs 10022/11104, 1977 |
| L150 | 1938/1977 | M-C/LTE | B-B | weed killer motor | ex-1938 DM 10327 |
| L151 | 1938/1977 | M-C/LTE | B-B | weed killer motor | ex-1938 DM 11327 |
| L152–L155 | 1938 | M-C | B-B | ballast motor | ex-1938 DMs 10266/11266/10141/11141, 1978 |
Except where indicated, this table is referenced from Bruce 1987, pp. 88–96 and most recently updated by Hardy 2002, pp. 102–105

Abbreviations
| AC&F | American Car and Foundry Company | Philadelphia USA |
| BP&C | Beyer, Peacock and Company | Gorton, Manchester |
| BRCW | Birmingham Railway Carriage and Wagon Company | Birmingham |
| BREL | British Rail Engineering Limited | Doncaster |
| CL | Cammell Laird | Birkenhead |
| CRAV | Cravens Railway Carriage and Wagon Company Ltd. | Sheffield |
| DM | Driving Motor | |
| GRCW | Gloucester Railway Carriage and Wagon Company | Gloucester |
| HL | Hawthorn Leslie | Tyneside |
| HN | Hurst, Nelson and Company | Motherwell |
| HUNS | Hunslet Engine Company | Hunslet, Leeds |
| KS&C | Kerr, Stuart and Company | Stoke-on-Trent |
| LPTB | London Passenger Transport Board | Acton Works |
| LT/LTE | London Transport (Executive) | Acton Works |
| M-B | Mercedes-Benz | Germany |
| M-C | Metro Cammell | Birmingham |
| MARC&W | Metropolitan Amalgamated Railway Carriage & Wagon Company | Birmingham |
| MC&W | Metropolitan Carriage, Wagon and Finance Company | Birmingham |
| MET | Metropolitan Railway | Neasden Works |
| P&C | Peckett & Company | St. George, Bristol |
| PICK | Pickering | |
| R&R | Ransome and Rapier | Ipswich |
| RR | Rolls-Royce | Shrewsbury |
| TH | Thomas Hill | Rotherham |
| UERL | Underground Electric Railways of London | Acton Works |
| YEC | Yorkshire Engine Company | Sheffield |
