= London Underground diesel locomotives =

Diesel engines on British metro system

- Stock type: Deep-level tube

Diesel locomotives have seen limited use on the London Underground, largely because exhaust gases cannot be discharged when the vehicles are working in tunnels. A prototype diesel engine numbered DEL120 was built in 1939 from two 1915 stock motor cars, which was expected to be part of a batch of ten, but experience with battery locomotives showed that these were a better alternative. Three 0-6-0 diesels (DL81-DL83) were obtained in 1971, to replace the last steam engines, but were too short to operate the signalling system, and too heavy for some of the bridges. In 1996, fourteen diesels (numbered 1 through 14, but also given female names) were supplied by Schöma of Germany, which were used during the construction of the Jubilee line tunnels. They were fitted with exhaust scrubbers, to enable them to work in the tunnels. To speed up track renewals on the subsurface lines, Class 66 locomotives have been hired in since 2006 to handle permanent way trains, but again suffer from being too heavy for some of the bridges. Because they are not fitted with tripcock safety devices, and pull trains much longer than the signalling system is designed for, they are restricted to slow speed running.

== DEL120 ==
=== Design ===
The design of a prototype diesel locomotive which could work through London's tube tunnels was first considered in 1936, and work began on its construction at Acton Works in 1939. It was designed to use its diesel engine when in the open air, but to draw current from the third and fourth rail when underground. Two Brush built 1915 Stock (also known as 'Ealing Stock') driving motors, numbered 3937 and 3941, which had been withdrawn from the Central London line, were converted into the electro-diesel locomotive. The work involved scrapping the passenger saloons and joining the two driving ends together to form a double ended locomotive. The central bay held a six-cylinder two-stroke diesel engine, manufactured by Petters, which was coupled to a direct current generator.

=== Construction ===
The prototype, which was the first electro-diesel locomotive to be constructed in Britain, was completed in November 1940, and was painted in Metropolitan 'Lake', with gold lining. It was intended to build ten similar locomotives, to replace the fleet of steam engines, and a further 18 withdrawn motor cars were stored at Cockfosters depot with this in mind. The construction of further locomotives was delayed by the outbreak of the Second World War, and experience with the 1935 fleet of battery locomotives showed that these were a better solution.

=== Service ===
DEL120 entered normal service in 1941, but was not a success, as the complicated operating system resulted in frequent breakdowns and repairs. It was used initially around Watford, and was transferred to Hainault to work ballast trains after an overhaul in 1952. It was moved to Golders Green depot temporarily, to operate a works train while an experimental ground wheel lathe was installed. The diesel engine was removed in 1954, after which it was only used for shunting, initially at Hainault and later at Acton. It was not ideal as a shunting engine, as visibility from the cab was poor, and access difficult, and so it was idle from 1956, finally being scrapped in 1958.

== DL81-DL83 ==
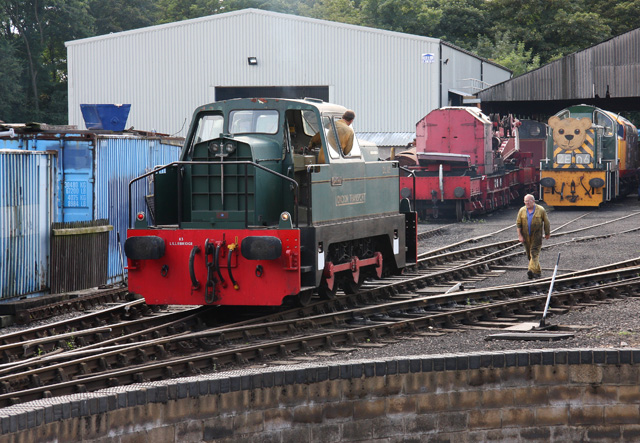
Ex-London Transport Sentinel shunter DL83 at the Nene Valley Railway

Three Rolls-Royce-engined diesel-hydraulic locomotives were built in 1967–68, and were supplied to an open-cast iron ore mine at Corby. When the iron ore was worked out, the locomotives were surplus to requirements, and were acquired by London Transport in 1971. They were numbered in the range DL81-DL83. All three were standard 0-6-0DH Sentinel diesel shunters obtained from Thomas Hill (Rotherham) Ltd (the Rolls Royce/Sentinel dealer). They were painted dark green and operated at Neasden and Lillie Bridge depots where they replaced the last of the ex-GWR pannier tank steam locomotives.

The locomotives had a wheelbase of only 9 feet 8 inches (2.95 m), and this was too short to operate the track circuits. Since this made their use impracticable, each was permanently coupled to a tender, which consisted of a bogie removed from a redundant District line Q Stock car. The weight of the bogie was increased to 17 tons, and it was fitted with tripcocks and sleet brushes, so that it could be used for clearing snow and ice from the current rails. Although the tenders were permanently coupled to the locomotives, they carried separate numbers, and were identified as DT81, DT82 and DT83. The tender increased the wheelbase to 28 feet 6 inches (8.69 m).

One locomotive was normally operational at each of the depots, with the third kept as a spare. Transfers between the works occurred when maintenance or repairs were necessary. Movement outside of the depots was severely restricted when the civil engineering department decided that the short wheelbase and 16-ton axle loading might cause overloading problems on a number of bridges. Both the free end (front) of the locomotive and the tender were fitted with 'Ward' type couplers as well as normal buffers and couplings to allow them the couple to almost any Departmental rolling stock (at the time).

The locomotives had all been withdrawn from service by March 1993, as engineers trains were no longer operated from Neasden Depot. Two locomotives were subsequently preserved; no. DL82 on the Epping Ongar Railway and no. DL83 on the Nene Valley Railway. The third locomotive, no. DL81, was sold for further use with an industrial user.

Number	Year built	Builder	Type	Builder Number	Use	Sold to
DL81	1968	Rolls Royce	0-6-0	10278	Lillie Bridge shunters	Preserved at Rutland Railway Museum (Cottesmore)
DL82	1968	Rolls Royce	0-6-0	10272	Neasden / Lillie Bridge	Preserved at Epping Ongar Railway
DL83	1967	Rolls Royce	0-6-0	10271	Neasden / Lillie Bridge	Preserved at Nene Valley Railway

== Schöma ==
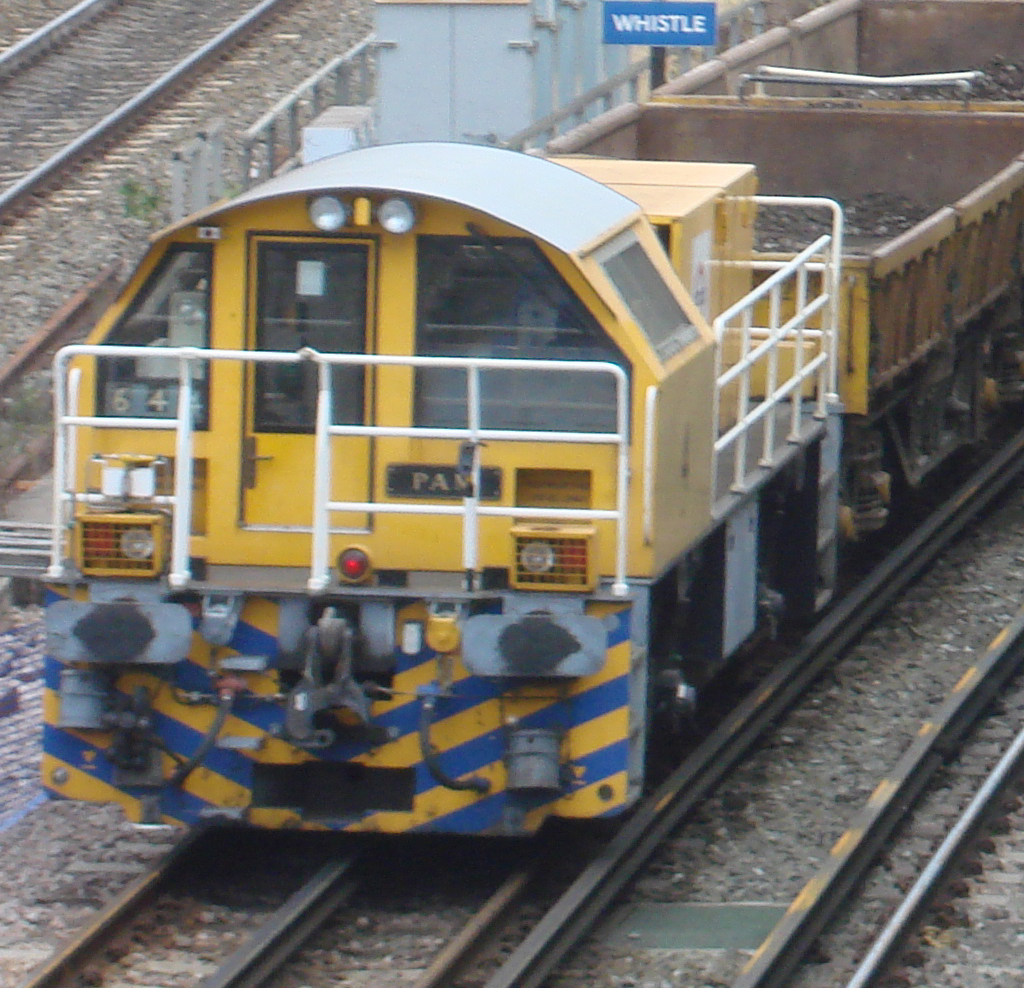
London Underground Schöma locomotive No.4 Pam.

London Underground Schöma diesel locomotives
No.	Name
1	Britta Lotta
2	Nikki
3	Claire
4	Pam
5	Sophie
6	Denise
7	Annemarie
8	Emma
9	Debora
10	Clementine
11	Joan
12	Melanie
13	Michele
14	Carol

In connection with the construction of the Jubilee Line Extension project, fourteen diesel-hydraulic locomotives were purchased from Schöma of Germany to assist in equipping the tunnels prior to electrification. Weighing 33.88 tonnes each, they are 28 feet (8.5 m) long, and are powered by 500-horsepower (370 kW) six-cylinder inline diesel engines, which give them a maximum speed of 31 mph (50 km/h). They entered service from February 1996, are built to tube tunnel loading gauge, and were fitted with buckeye couplers when built. They are equipped with exhaust scrubbers to prevent soot and other particles from being expelled into the tunnels. The locomotives have since been used on other engineering projects. When not in use they can be found at Lillie Bridge Depot or Ruislip depot.

Following the completion of the Jubilee Line extension, ownership of the vehicles was transferred to London Underground Transplant. Numbers 1 and 5 have been modified by fitting Wedglock couplers so that they can be used to shunt tube stock, whilst numbers 3 and 6 have been fitted with emergency couplers.

The locomotives were sold by an auction on 14 August 2024.

== Leased locomotives ==
=== Class 66 ===
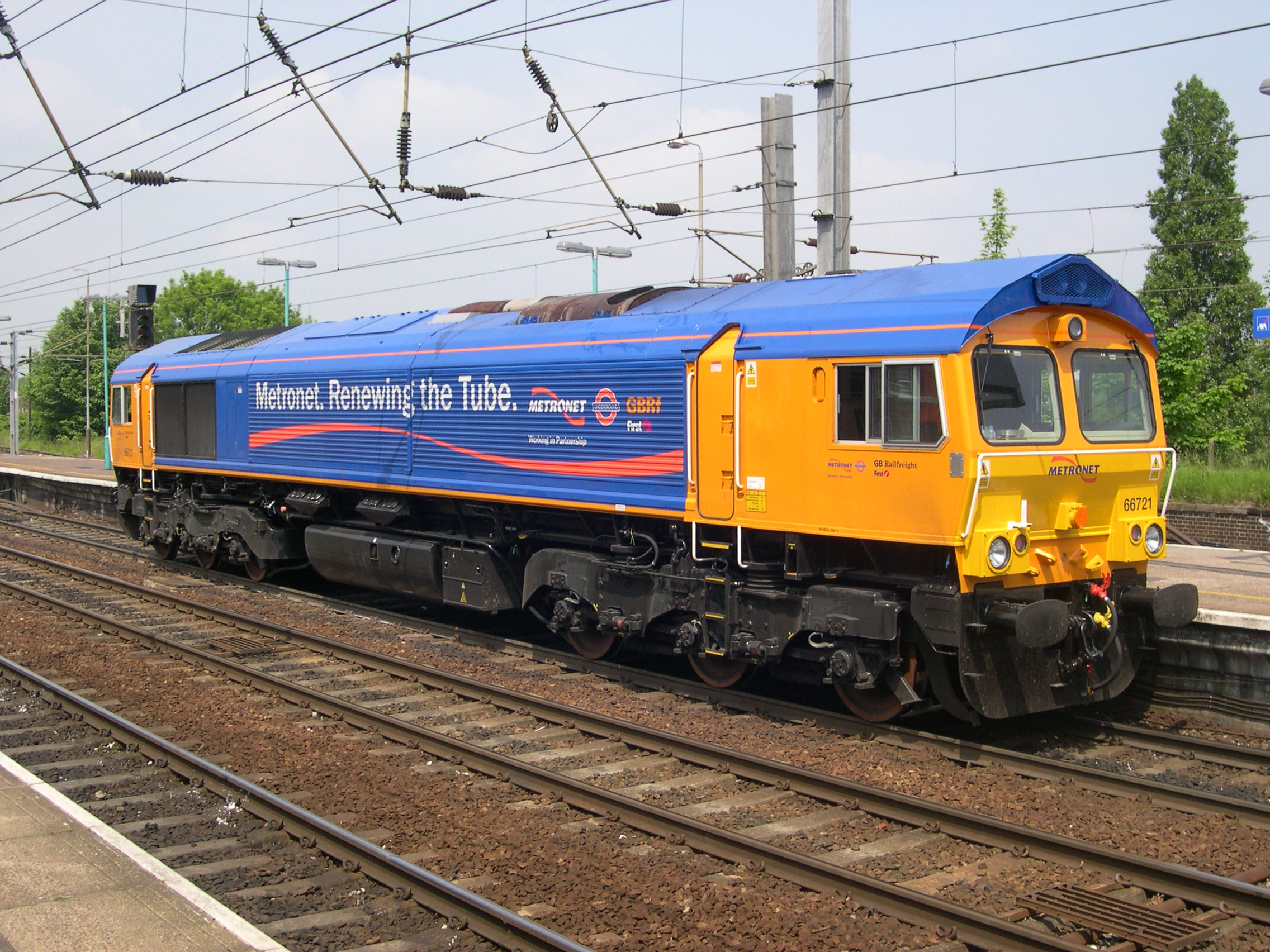
A class 66 in Metronet livery

Metronet contracted five newly built Class 66 locomotives from GB Railfreight in order to speed up track replacement works on the London Underground network. They were first used in August 2006, pulling engineering trains consisting of wagons and high-output track laying equipment nearly 440 yards (400 m) long. The locomotives are capable of hauling consists with a maximum length of 470 yards (430 m), thus reducing from 30 to 8 the number of trains needed to supply materials to relay a typical weekend possession of track, and as a consequence increasing the amount of track that can be renewed. One disadvantage of the heavier locomotives is that bridges on the District line needed to be strengthened to carry the extra weight. While working on the network, they are restricted to a maximum speed of 15 mph (24 km/h), since they are not fitted with tripcocks, and the signalling infrastructure is only designed to cope with trains having a maximum length of 150 yards (137 m).

== Sources ==
- Bruce, J. Graeme (1987). Workhorses of the London Underground. Capital Transport Publishing. ISBN 0-904711-87-0.
- Hardy, Brian (1993). London Underground Rolling Stock (13th ed.). Harrow Weald: Capital Transport. ISBN 978-1-85414-164-4.
- Hardy, Brian (2002). London Underground Rolling Stock (15th ed.). Harrow Weald: Capital Transport. ISBN 978-1-85414-263-4.
