= London Underground battery–electric locomotives =

London Underground battery-electric locomotives
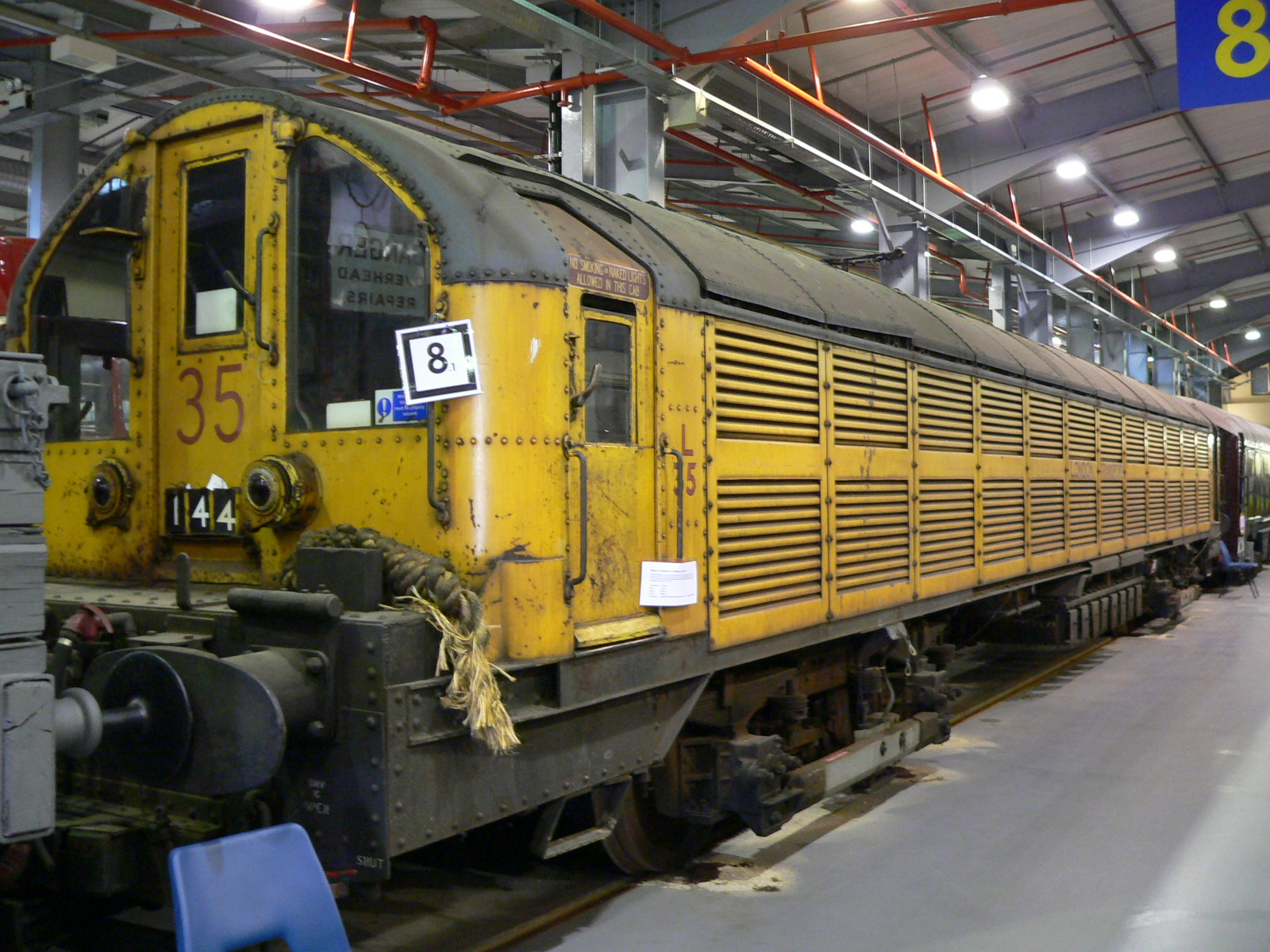
- Preserved L35 at the London Transport Museum in November 2005

London Underground battery-electric locomotives are battery locomotives used for hauling engineers' trains on the London Underground network where they can operate when the electric traction current is switched off. The first two locomotives were built in 1905 for the construction of the Great Northern, Piccadilly and Brompton Railway, and their success prompted the District Railway to buy two more in 1909, which were the only ones built to the loading gauge of the subsurface lines. Following this, a number of battery vehicles were built by converting redundant motor cars, with the batteries placed in the unused passenger compartment. One exception to this was made by the City and South London Railway, who used a trailer car to hold the batteries, and wired them to a separate locomotive.

From 1936, battery locomotives were built as new vehicles, although in most cases, some components, particularly the bogies and motors, were refurbished from withdrawn passenger cars. The batch of nine vehicles supplied by Gloucester Railway Carriage and Wagon Company between 1936 and 1938 set the standard for subsequent builds. Including this batch, 52 machines had been built by 1986, in six batches from four manufacturers, with one built at London Transport's Acton Works. Each new batch included some improvements, but most used electro-pneumatic traction control equipment made by GEC, and so could be operated together. The exception were three from the 1936 batch, which used an experimental Metadyne system, and the final batch of six, built in 1985, which used controllers manufactured by Kiepe.

Improvements since manufacture have included the replacement of low-level Ward couplers by buckeye couplers, which has resulted in less damage from shunting accidents, and the fitting of draught excluders and cab heaters for use in winter when the locomotives operate on sections of line above ground. A number of the machines were fitted with Automatic Train Protection (ATP) in-cab signalling equipment to enable them to work on the newly opened Victoria line, and later on the Central line after ATP was installed. More were fitted with Transmission Based Train Control (TBTC) for the Jubilee and Northern lines and Communication Based Train Control (CBTC) as part of the Four Lines Modernisation.

== Early vehicles ==
The first two battery locomotives supplied for the London Underground were manufactured by Hurst Nelson and Co, who were based in Motherwell. They were delivered in August 1905, and were used during the construction of the Great Northern, Piccadilly and Brompton Railway, where they were numbered 1B and 2B. The vehicles were 50.5 feet (15.4 m) long, with a tube-gauge cab at both ends. Braking and electrical control equipment was housed in a compartment behind one of the cabs, and the central section was lower, housing the 80 batteries, arranged in two rows of 40 either side of a central divide, which also supported metal covers for the battery compartments. The batteries were supplied by Chloride Electrical Storage Company. Each locomotive weighed 55 tons, and could haul a 60-ton load at 7 km/h (4.3 mph). They were not fitted with current collector shoes, as none of the rails were electrified during construction. Once their task was completed, they were moved by road to the Hampstead Railway.

Encouraged by the performance of the vehicles, the District Railway purchased two of their own in 1909, which were larger as they were built to subsurface-gauge. The manufacturer was W. R. Renshaw and Co Ltd, who were based in Stoke-on-Trent in Staffordshire, and the vehicles were fitted with current collector shoes, so that they could draw power from the rails when it was available. During the First World War, they were used as shunting engines at Ealing Common Depot, where power was always available, and so the batteries were removed, and subsequently neglected. New batteries could not be obtained, as batteries of this type were needed for submarines as part of the war effort. The vehicles were numbered 19A and 20A when supplied, but were renumbered as L8 and L9 in 1929, when the batteries were no longer fitted. As electric locomotives, they were upgraded several times, receiving two new types of motors in 1951 and 1955, and new traction control equipment in 1958. They continued to be used to move stores between Acton Works and Ealing Common Depot, until they were superseded by road vehicles in 1969.

=== Conversions ===
The next batch of battery locomotives was made by converting existing stock. When it opened, the Central London Railway (CLR) had suffered from vibration problems, caused by the heavy locomotives, and had experimented with multiple unit operation, with motive power provided by converting four trailer cars to motor cars. Around 1910, two of these motor cars, numbered 201 and 202, were fitted with batteries, and worked on a number of lines in addition to the Central London Railway. In 1915 they were loaned to the Bakerloo line, when it was being extended to Queen's Park. Car 202 had its 'NiFe' battery updated to one with 263 cells made by Edison Accumulator Ltd in 1924, while the number of cells in car 201 was increased from 200 to 238 in 1932. For working on other lines, they were fitted with outside shoes, since most lines used a four-rail system, whereas the CLR used only three. The vehicles were numbered L22 and L23 in 1929, and were scrapped in 1936 and 1937.

When the City and South London Railway was being reconstructed in 1922, a number of "padded cell" trailer cars – so-called because of their lack of windows – were stripped out, so that lead-acid batteries and charging resistances could be placed in the resulting space. Each car was then coupled to an electric locomotive, and the batteries were connected to the shoe fuses of the locomotive. The current rail shoes were removed, so that the batteries did not energise the rails. Recharging was arranged at certain points, by means of switches and cables connected to the supply that normally fed the rails.

Two Hungarian gate stock cars, which had previously been used as ballast motor cars, were converted to battery operation. When working as passenger vehicles on the Piccadilly line, they had been numbered 34 and 39. In 1929 they were transferred to the Hampstead line, where they were numbered 113 and 118, becoming L11 and L12 in 1936. Shortly afterwards, the numbers were swapped, so that L11 became L12 and L12 became L11. They used batteries made by DP Battery Company, each with 220 cells. The final conversion was of Bakerloo car 66, originally made by the American Car and Foundry Company, and fitted with a 220-cell DP battery weighing 6.5 tons in 1932. It was numbered L32, and was scrapped in 1948.

== Main battery locomotives ==
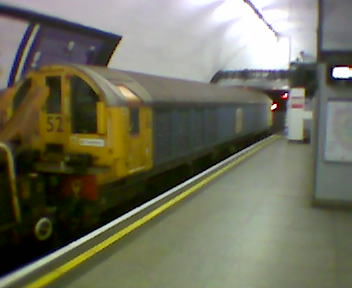
A battery-electric locomotive at Euston station, April 2006

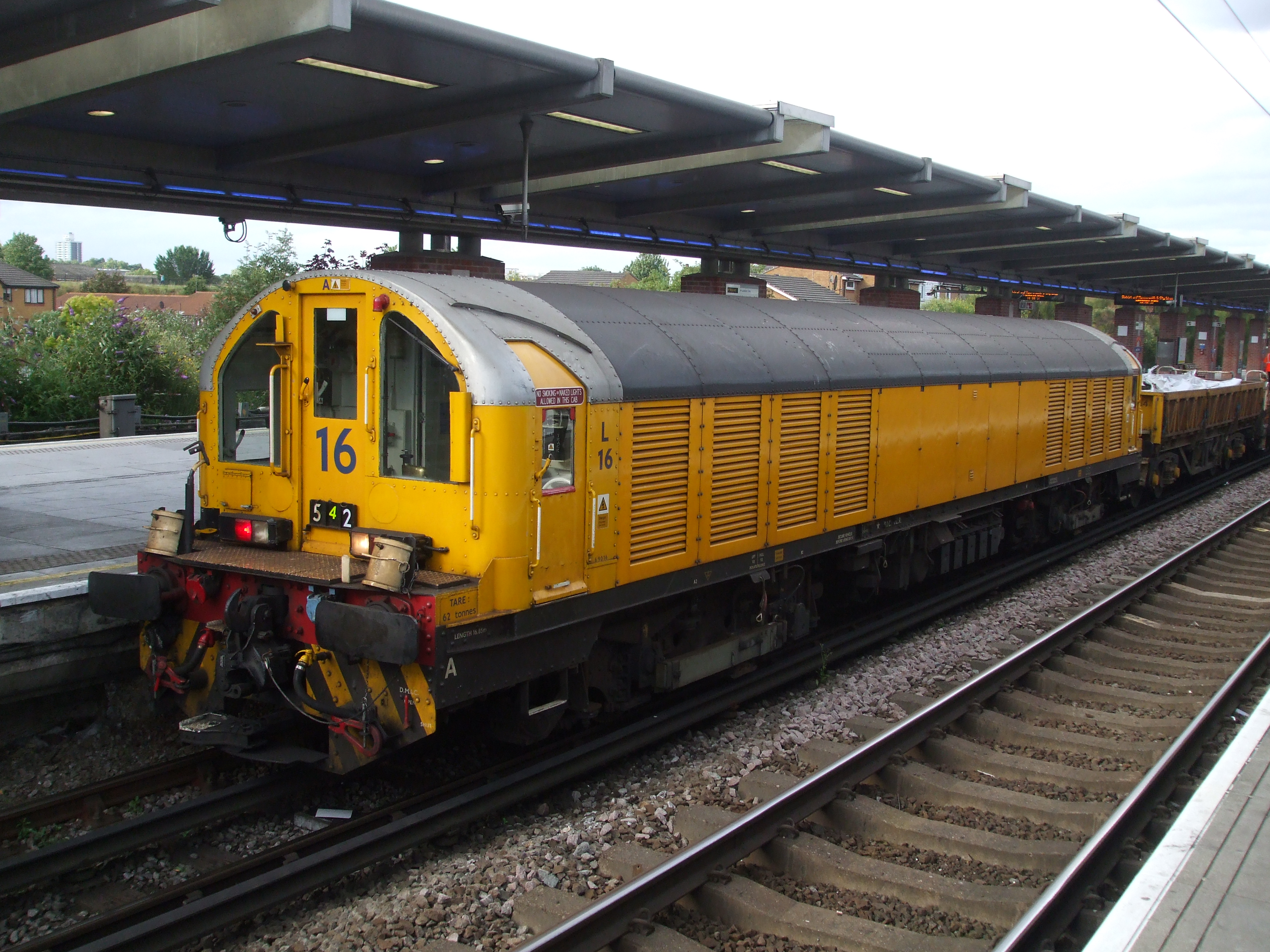
Locomotive L16 seen at West Ham station (District line platforms).

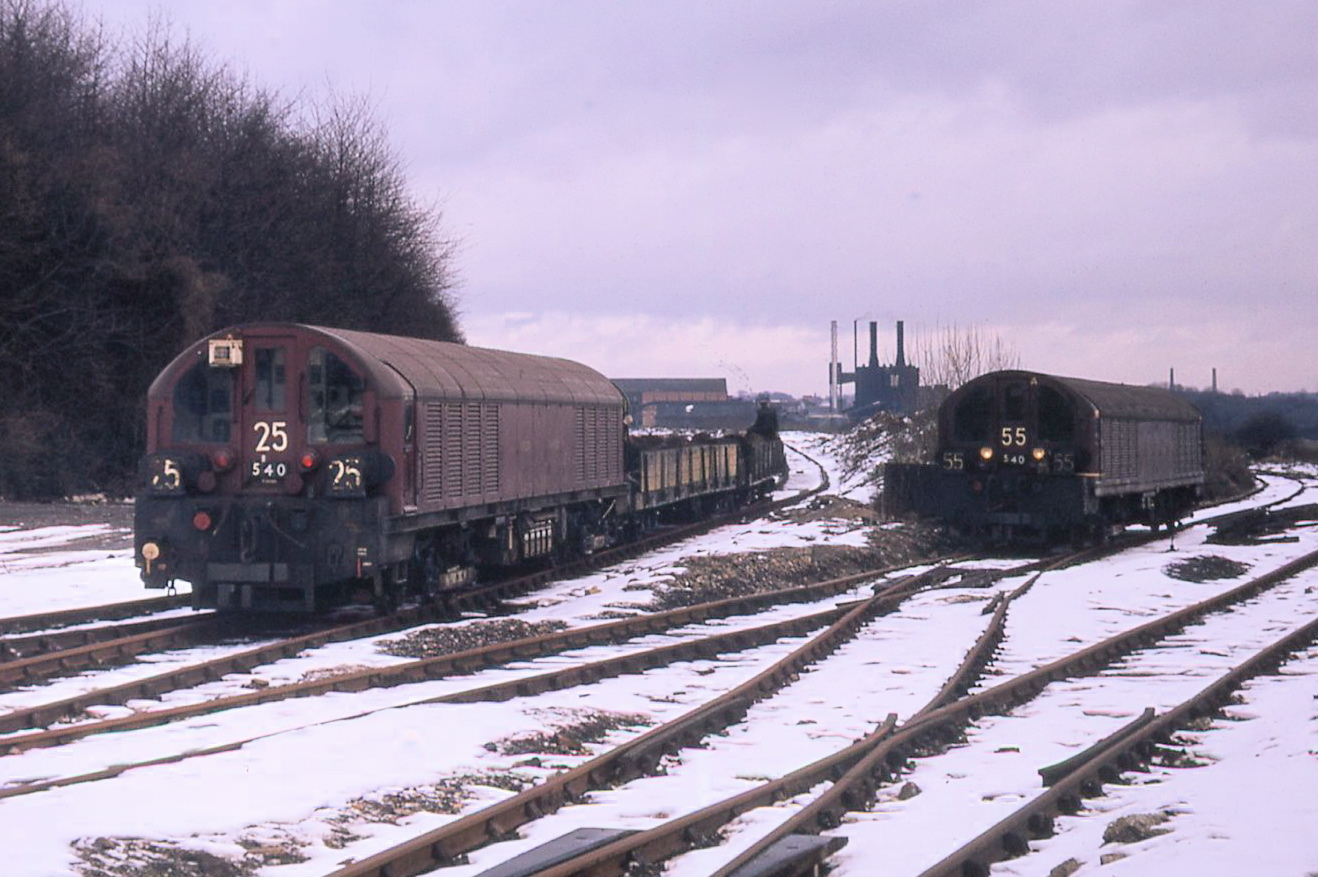
LT battery-electric locomotives at Croxley Tip, 1971

In 1936, the decision was taken to purchase a batch of new battery locomotives, and an order was placed with the Gloucester Railway Carriage & Wagon Company for nine vehicles, six of which would be fitted with GEC traction control equipment, while the other three would be fitted with metadyne units. The GEC-fitted machines weighed 53.8 tons, and were numbered L35 to L40, while the Metadyne-equipped ones weighed an extra 2.2 tons, and were numbered L41 to L43. Both types, when pulling a 200-ton ballast train, could run at 30 mph (48 km/h) when supplied with power from the current rails, and at half that speed when working on batteries.

The metadyne-fitted locomotives had new bodies, but the bogies and motors were removed from redundant Metropolitan line stock and refurbished at Acton Works. Similarly, the metadyne equipment was removed from an experimental train and reused. A metadyne unit consists of a rotating machine, which converts the constant voltage supplied by the battery to a constant current, which feeds the motor. The metadyne system is more efficient than conventional starting resistances, particularly when the locomotive starts and stops frequently, or when it needs to run for long periods at slow speeds. For cable laying work, the metadyne-equipped locomotives could pull trains of 100 tons at 3 mph (5 km/h) for considerable distances, without any sign of overheating. Despite the advantages, their complexity resulted in them becoming unreliable, and they were withdrawn in 1977. L41 and L42 were scrapped soon afterwards, but L43 was used for testing purposes for a further three years.

The locomotives fitted with GEC controls used an electro-pneumatic controller, with 28 steps, which allowed the four motors to be connected in series, in two parallel-series pairs, and all in parallel as the speed increased. Pairs of locomotives could be operated in multiple, and motors 1 and 3 or 2 and 4 could be selected if there was a failure of the other pair. As built, the vehicles were 54.3 feet (16.6 m) long, and could pick up power either from a standard four-rail configuration, or the three-rail configuration of the Central London Railway, until it was converted to four rails in 1940.

The next batch of seven vehicles were manufactured by R. Y. Pickering and Co Ltd, who were based in Wishaw, Scotland. The traction control equipment was by GEC, although the batteries had a larger capacity than the previous batch. The motors were reused from passenger stock which was being withdrawn at the time. One important improvement was the addition of runners and a lifting device, which enabled any battery cell to be removed from its rack and lowered to the ground through an aperture in the floor. This feature meant that the batteries could be changed without using an overhead crane in a lifting shop, freeing it for more important work. An eighth locomotive was built by staff at Acton Works in 1962, partly as an exercise to prove that the workshop could compete for this type of work. This vehicle was initially numbered L76, and took part in the Metropolitan Railway centenary celebrations, held on 23 May 1963, when it propelled a replica of the original inspection train of open wagons used by William Ewart Gladstone and other dignitaries.

Metro-Cammell received the order for the next batch of thirteen locomotives, which were numbered L20 to L32. The first one was delivered on 8 December 1964 to Ruislip Depot. They were part of a programme to phase out the last remaining steam engines, but the Victoria line was also being built at this time, and some of the battery locos were fitted with automatic train operation (ATO) equipment, to enable them to work on that line. Traction control equipment was by GEC, with the batteries supplied by DP Battery Co Ltd. As with previous batches, parts of the locomotives were refurbished; in this case, the bogies, traction motors and compressors were supplied by Acton Works. Unlike earlier models, each vehicle was fitted with two compressors, allowing them to work singly. The last steam engines were withdrawn soon afterwards, and an order for five more battery locos was placed with Metro-Cammell in 1969. These worked on the Jubilee line construction, and were numbered L15 to L19.

The construction of the Jubilee line and the Heathrow extension of the Piccadilly line required yet more works trains, and eleven more locomotives were ordered in 1972, with delivery in 1973. They were built at Doncaster Works by British Rail Engineering Limited. The motors were refurbished from redundant District line stock, but the bogies were new. Although based on the standard Z-type bogie used since the 1930s, they incorporated roller bearings, rather than white metal axleboxes and suspension bearings. Three of the locomotives were built to replace the three metadyne vehicles, but those were not actually withdrawn until 1977.

A final batch of six locomotives was built by Metro-Cammell and delivered in 1985 and 1986. They incorporated all of the improvements made to the previous vehicles. For the first time, they were specified in metric units. New features included entry to the cabs through a central door, rather than a side door, strengthened windscreens with windscreen wipers, and the ability to charge the batteries while operating on electrified lines. One departure was the fitting of traction control equipment by Kiepe, which prevented them from working in multiple with any of the previous machines. They were not a success, as five of the six had been withdrawn from service by August 1993, while a decision was made about their future, and the sixth was withdrawn some time later. They were numbered L62 to L67, and all were still in store in 2002.

=== Roster ===
Battery Electric Locomotives
LT Numbers	Number Built	Builder	Year	Notes
L35 – L40	6	GRC&W	1936/8	Withdrawn from service, L35 preserved at London Transport Museum
L41 – L43	3	GRC&W	1936/8	Metadyne control. Scrapped 1978 and 1980
L55 – L61	7	Pickering	1951/2	Withdrawn between 1987 and 1997, all believed scrapped.
L33	1	Acton Works	1962	Originally L76, withdrawn from service
L20 – L32	13	Metro-Cammell	1964/5	In Service
L15 – L19	5	Metro-Cammell	1970/1	In Service
L44 – L54	11	Doncaster Works	1973/4	In Service
L62 – L67	6	Metro-Cammell	1985	Withdrawn from service, scrapped.

=== Design ===
All locomotives were built to a similar design, but with a number of variations included over the years of development. Numbers L41-L43 had Metadyne control gear.

The locomotives have a cab at each end and are built to the standard 'Tube' loading gauge so that they can work over all lines on the London Underground network. They are equipped with buffers and drawhooks, for coupling to standard main line vehicles. Earlier vehicles had hinged buffers, which could be raised upwards when not in use, but this job was arduous, and a programme of replacing them with retractable buffers was carried out. They were also fitted with a 'Ward' coupler, mounted at a height suitable for tube cars, but this made the locomotives prone to significant damage in shunting accidents. In 1980, two locomotives, L18 and L38, were fitted with buckeye couplings, as an experiment. These automatic couplings are mounted at the height of the main frames, and so shunting damage is significantly reduced. The success of the experiment led to buckeye couplings being retro-fitted to all locomotives built from 1964. Additionally, they all have train air-brake equipment.

The body sides take the form of louvres to allow ventilation around the batteries, although most locomotives had four solid body panels on one side only. All body panels are hinged to allow the batteries to be removed. Following the withdrawal of steam engines, the vehicles often worked on open sections of line, rather than in tunnels, and the need to heat the cabs in winter became apparent. Draught excluders have been added to all cab doors, and additional heaters have been fitted into the cabs.

The original livery was grey, but crimson lake was applied from the early 1960s using supplies of LT steam locomotive paint. This was changed to yellow in the early 1980s, which was deemed to be more safety conscious.

=== Power ===
The locomotives can draw power from the 630 V electrified rails like a normal tube train, or run on 320 V DC traction batteries when the power is switched off. Since most of the traction motors were removed from redundant stock for fitting into the vehicles, Acton Works have had to convert them from 630 V operation to work on 320 V. The lead-acid batteries are usually recharged inside a depot, although the 1985 batch of locomotives could recharge their batteries from the power rails while moving.

=== Protection ===
All battery locomotives are fitted with tripcocks which are operated by trackside equipment if the train passes a signal at danger. Eighteen (L15–L21 and L44–L54) are also fitted with Central line Automatic Train Protection (ATP). When they were built, locomotives L25 to L32 were fitted with Automatic Train Operation (ATO) equipment, which allowed them to work on the Victoria line. The tripcock could be isolated, and a trip valve performed a similar function, except that it was operated by the ATO controller. A special setting was provided that allowed the vehicles to move if they were not receiving safety track signals, but the maximum speed in these circumstances was limited to 10 mph (16 km/h). By the mid-1980s, this equipment had ceased to be used, as works trains were only run on the Victoria line when engineers had possession of the whole line. Subsequently, some locomotives (L27–L32) have been fitted with a new type of Victoria line ATP equipment which was designed by Metronet on behalf of Transplant, the operator of the fleet. This system was installed during 2007 at Ruislip Depot. It is compatible with the new Distance-to-Go Radio (DTG-R) ATP system which has been implemented on the Victoria line by Westinghouse Rail Systems.

=== Ownership ===
During the London Underground's PPP period, the locomotives were in the ownership of TransPlant. TransPlant has since been brought back in-house as Engineering Vehicle Operations. The locomotives are all based at Ruislip Depot.

=== Use ===
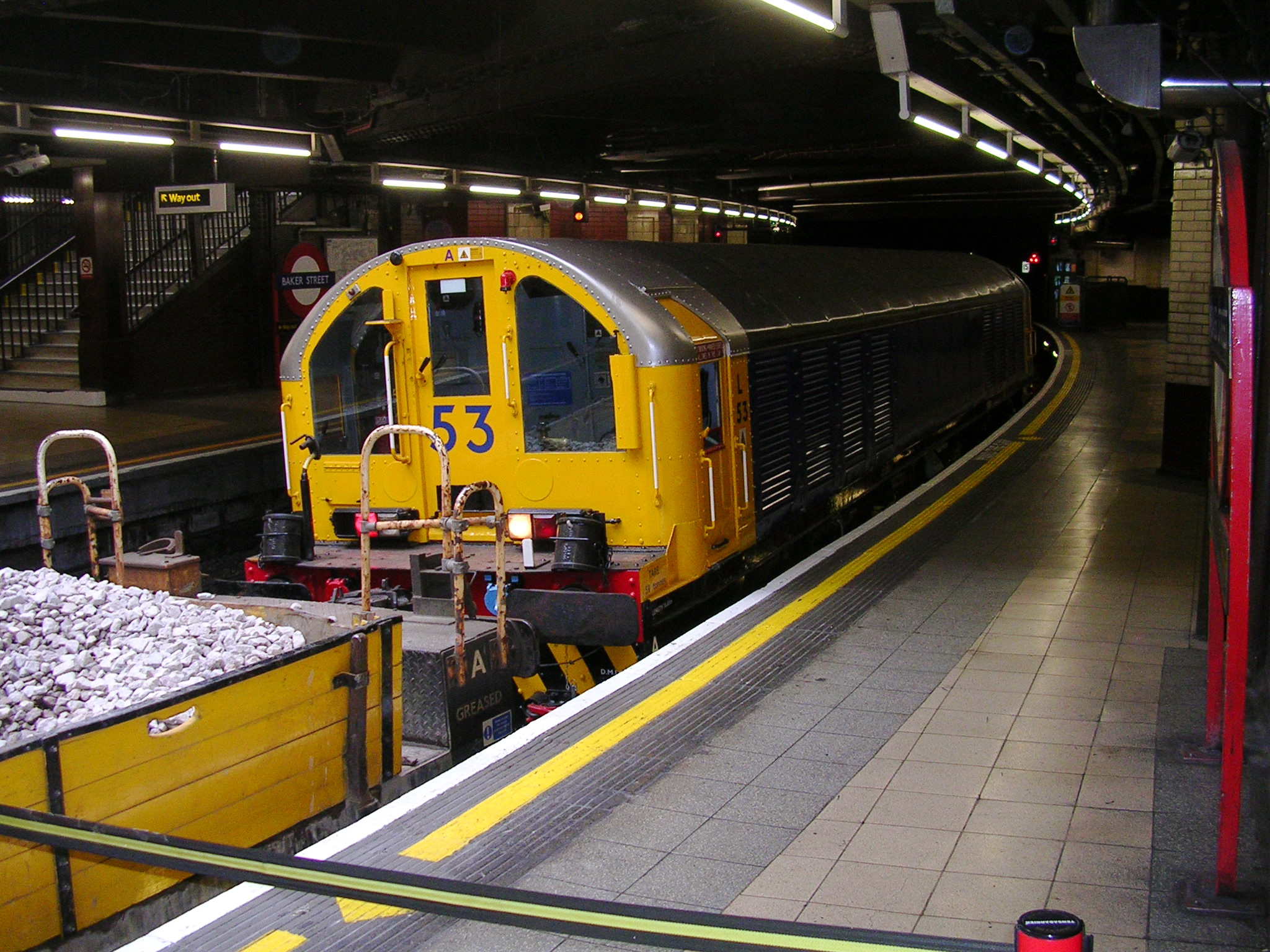
L53 locomotive at one end of a track ballast train waiting at Baker Street station, July 2006.

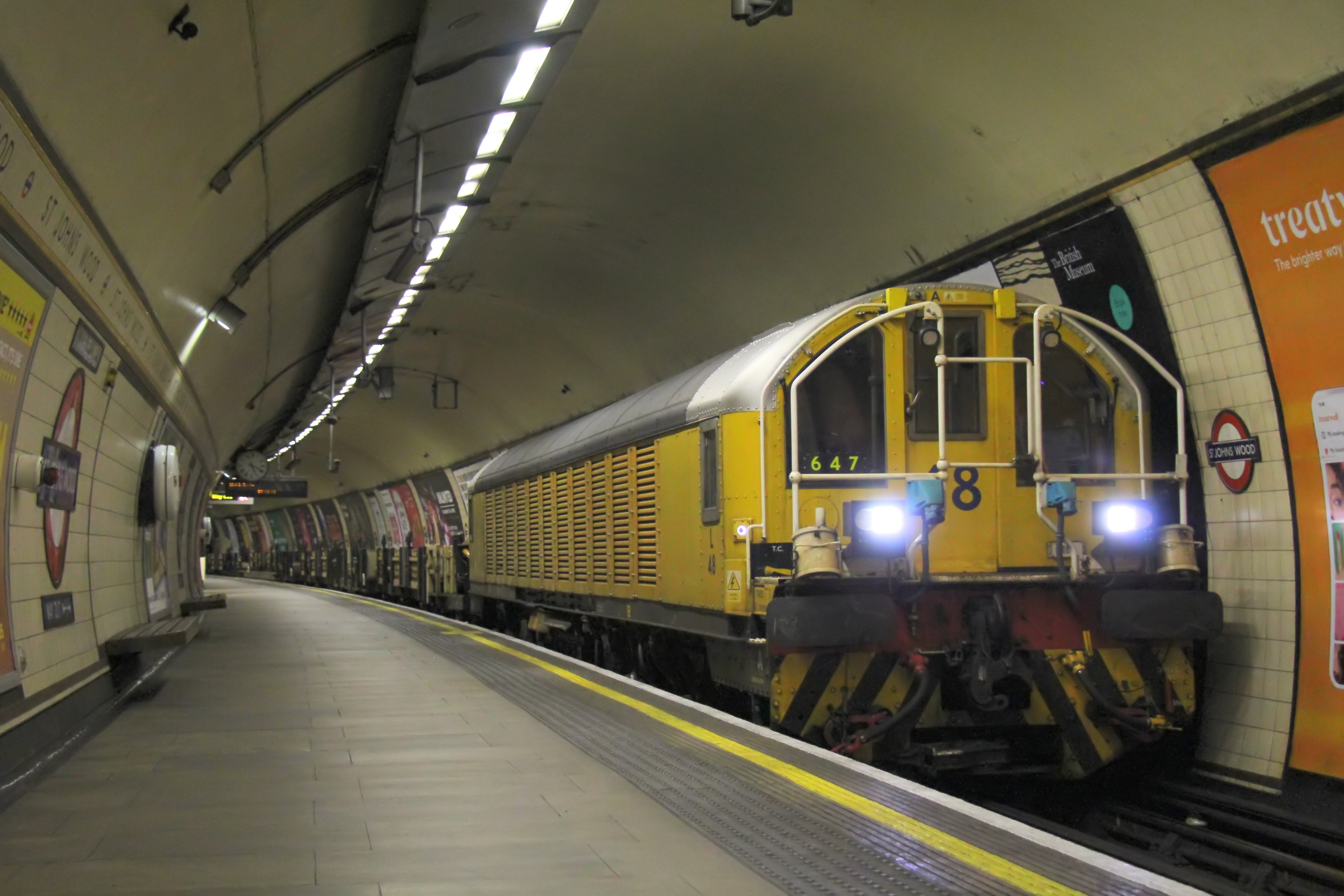
L48 passing St John's Wood tube station coming from overnight work on the Bakerloo Line, April 2019

The traditional use of these locomotives has been to haul trains using power from the rails until they reach the area where work is to be undertaken, where they switch to battery operation if the traction supply has been isolated. They are also used for transporting diesel powered equipment such as track tamping machines through tunnel sections. Normally one locomotive is marshalled at each end of the train, allowing the train to be reversed easily. The connections between different Underground lines often require reversals on route. Early locomotives were not allowed to operate on their own as they only had a single air compressor, but twin compressors were fitted to vehicles built from 1964 onwards, to allow single operation.

With the building of the Jubilee line, diesel-powered locomotives manufactured by Schöma of Germany in 1996 took over some of the duties of the battery locomotives.

== Metronet battery locomotives ==
In February 2006, Metronet received four small battery locomotives. These were named Walter, Lou, Anne, and Kitty, names that pun the name of the line they were bought to work on, London Underground's Waterloo & City line. They are used for hauling materials and equipment and were specially designed and built for work in narrow tunnels with tight curves and steep gradients. Clayton Equipment of Derby designed and built them in about four months. The locomotives weigh 15 tonnes each and have 200 Volt DC motors providing 75 hp (56 kW) to each axle. As a fail-safe feature they have spring-applied disc brakes that are automatically applied if something goes wrong. Built-in cameras are connected to screens in the cab to make shunting easier. Unlike the earlier battery-electric locomotives, these locomotives cannot draw power from the electrified rails. Under normal use this is not a problem because they are designed to work on engineering projects in tunnels where the power is cut off anyway, but it does mean they have to return to the depot to be recharged.
