= Ealing Common Depot =

London Underground railway depot on the District Line

Ealing Common depot
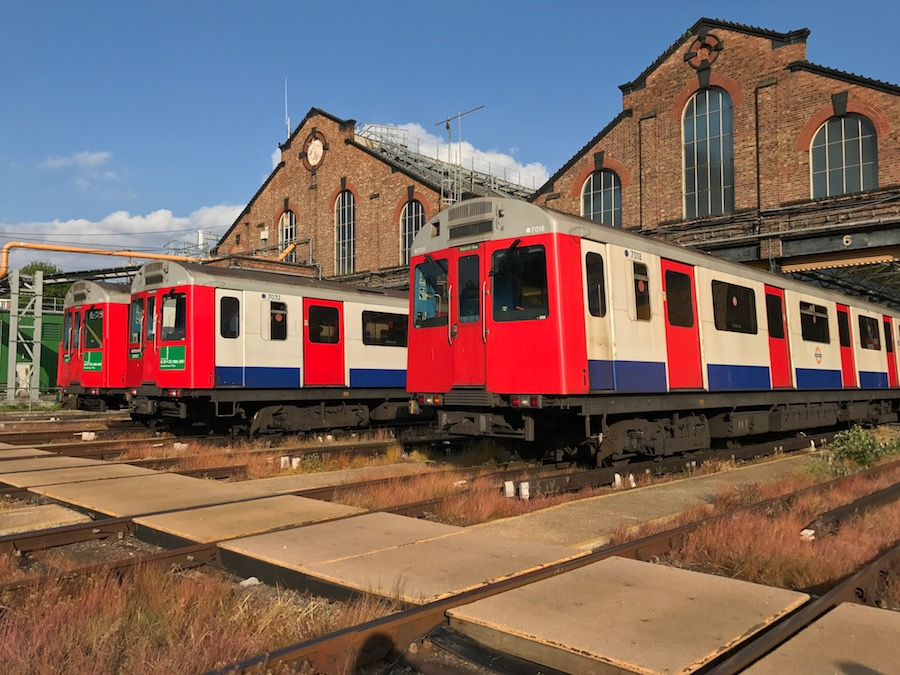
- Three Driving Motor (DM) cars of D78 Stock stand at the west end of Ealing Common Depot; (from left to right) 7526, 7032 and 7018. 7032-7007 were used on 7 May 2017 for the D Stock "Farewell" tour (photograph taken just after Train 755 had been stabled).
- Interactive map of Ealing Common depot

Location
- Location: Ealing, United Kingdom
- Coordinates: 51.5067°N 0.2852°W

Characteristics
- Owner: London Underground
- Type: Sub-surface stock

History
- Opened: 1905

Ealing Common Depot is a London Underground railway depot on the District line, located between Acton Town and Ealing Common stations in west London, England. It is one of the oldest main depots on the Underground, having been built in 1905, when the District Railway was upgraded for electric traction. All depot facilities were moved there from Lillie Bridge Depot, and it was known as Mill Hill Park Works. It subsequently became Ealing Common Works, and its status was reduced to that of a depot in 1922, when Acton Works was opened, and took over responsibility for all major overhauls. Most of the functions of Acton Works were devolved back to the depots, including Ealing Common, in 1985.

Extensive remodelling of the tracks around the depot took place in the 1930s, when the route from Acton Town to Northfields was quadrupled, and the local eastbound track from South Ealing station tunnels under some of the sidings in the depot. In 1990, a heavy repair shop was built at the southern end of the depot, but this function was transferred back to Acton Works, and the building is now used for storage of artefacts for the London Transport Museum. Access to the depot by rail can be gained from both tracks at Ealing Common station, where the junction is to the south of the platforms. At the southern end of the depot, a steep incline leads down to the two eastbound platforms at Acton Town station. Road access is from the A4020 Uxbridge Road at the north end, and a service road from the A4000 Gunnersbury Lane leads to the museum depot.

One of the first uses of the depot in 1905 was the storage of redundant steam locomotives, displaced by the new electric multiple units, pending disposal, and a regular steam service between Lillie Bridge and the depot operated for many years, for the transfer of stores. From 1932 a small number of Piccadilly line trains were also stored at the depot, and a small number of District line trains were stored at Northfields Depot, but this practice ended in 1964. The depot is now used for the storage of trains for the District line, and the number of trains required has steadily increased. It also carries out engineering work, and the final commissioning of the D78 Stock took place at the depot from 1979.

== History ==
The Metropolitan District Railway opened its first section of route from South Kensington to Westminster on 24 December 1868. It was extended on 12 April 1869, when the section from Gloucester Road via Earls Court to West Brompton was opened. When they took over the running of their own trains, rather than allowing the Metropolitan Railway to provide this service, they built a depot for their new rolling stock at Lillie Bridge, to the west of Earl's Court. Further extensions to the west occurred in 1874, when the line reached Hammersmith, and in 1879, when the line to Ealing Broadway was opened, with intermediate stops at Chiswick Park, Acton Town and Ealing Common.

Motive power on the District was initially by steam locomotive, but in 1905, the tracks were electrified, and the steam locomotives were replaced by electric multiple units. At the same time, the depot facilities were moved from Lillie Bridge to a new facility at Mill Hill Park. It was called Mill Hill Park Works, and later became Ealing Common Works, a title which it retained until 1922, when Acton Works opened and took over responsibility for major overhauls. It then became Ealing Common Depot, and is the oldest of the nine main depots on the underground, pre-dating Hammersmith by a year and Golders Green by two years. Mill Hill Park was also the name of Acton Town station, prior to a reorganisation of the tracks near the depot in 1910, which created a flying junction so that there was no conflict between westbound trains moving from Acton Town towards Ealing Broadway and movements on the line to South Ealing and Northfields. The new formation was completed on 20 February 1910, and the station was renamed on 1 March.

The depot is accessible from both ends, and lies in a north-west to south-east orientation, on the north-east side of the tracks between Ealing Common and Acton Town stations. The basic layout has remained much the same since its opening, with nine stabling sidings next to the running lines, and a car shed with another 11 tracks beyond those. Access to the depot is available from both tracks to the south of Ealing Common station, while trains leaving the depot at the south-eastern end can gain direct access to the Central London-bound tracks of the District and Piccadilly lines at Acton Town. To reach the west-bound tracks, trains must use one of the reversing sidings to the east of the station.

The first electric trains to use the depot were a fleet of 420 cars of B Stock, ordered in 1903, of which 280 were built in France and 140 in England. All cars were to be delivered by 1905, but both manufacturers were late completing their orders. They were all delivered to Mill Hill Park Works, where the Sprague-Thomson-Houston electro-magnetic control equipment was fitted, and enough vehicles were ready for the first electric service to start on 13 June 1905, running between South Acton and Hounslow, while electric trains ran from Whitechapel to Ealing Broadway for the first time on 1 July. One of the cars was scrapped in 1909 after it left the depot and ran empty to Ealing Broadway. On reaching the terminal station, there was insufficient air to apply the brakes, and it hit the buffer stops, killing one of the crew. The incident led to the fitting of a control governor to all trains on the Underground, which prevented forward motion unless there was sufficient air to apply the brakes.

Major reorganisation of the tracks around the edge of the depot occurred in the 1930s. The Piccadilly line was extended from Hammersmith to South Harrow on 4 July 1932, duplicating the District line service, and reached Uxbridge in late 1933. Piccadilly line trains also ran to Northfields from 9 January 1933, and onwards to Hounslow West from 13 March, again duplicating District line services. The westbound District line track from Acton Town towards Ealing Common had been organised as a flying junction since 1910, so that trains did not conflict with movements on the line to Northfields. Quadrupling of the tracks between Acton Town and Northfields was completed on 18 December 1932, and the additional eastbound track passed under the lines to Ealing Common and under several of the sidings in the depot, to reach Acton Town station. A new depot for Piccadilly line trains was constructed beyond Northfields station, and a few District line trains were stabled there, to operate the service to Hounslow West. In addition, some Piccadilly line trains were stabled at Ealing Common. This arrangement continued until 1964, after which Ealing Common was only used for District line stock and Northfields for Piccadilly line stock.

Acton Works continued to be the centre for major overhauls on stock from all lines on the Underground until 1985, when increased intervals between overhauls, better reliability of train equipment, and the age of some of the equipment at Acton resulted in maintenance functions being devolved back to the depots on each line. A new heavy repair shop was constructed at Ealing Common and opened at the end of 1990. It was located at the Acton Town end of the depot, on the high level sidings, and was officially the Depot Engineering Support Unit (DESU), but it was short-lived, as its function was soon moved back to Acton Works. The building has since been used to store vehicles belonging to the London Transport Museum collection. In 2009 it held over 370,000 items, and included 65,000 square feet (6,000 m^{2}) of environmentally controlled storage, where items are catalogued and conserved. It is not normally open to the public, but does so for occasional special events.

D Stock trains were transferred to the museum yard via Ealing Common Depot, and were then loaded onto low-loader trucks to be taken away for refurbishment. The trains were also returned to LUL this way.

In 2019, tracks to the car sheds were re-organised to facilitate the stabling of S7 Stock at the depot. Shed roads 6 and 7 were removed, and pointwork on the entry and exit tracks to the sheds was revamped.

=== Rolling stock ===
When the depot first opened, the fleet of steam locomotives were moved there, and stored awaiting scrapping. Although passenger trains had been electrically powered since 1905, the District retained a small number of steam locomotives for shunting duties, and in 1931 bought two new 0-6-0 tank locomotives from the Hunslet Engine Company. The pair were numbered L30 and L31, and were stabled at Lillie Bridge Depot, where they were used for shunting, but also ran stores trains from there to Ealing Common regularly. A weed-killing train was stabled at the depot from 1935 until 1950. Initially, this was made up from a driving motor car and a control trailer car of B Stock, dating from 1905, which had been modified by fitting tanks and nozzles to spray the weedkiller onto the tracks. The unit was underpowered, and the trailer was replaced by a second motor car. They were used regularly until the onset of the Second World War, when killing weeds was not a priority, and were scrapped in 1950.

When some of the rolling stock on the District line was being replaced in the early 1970s, four motor cars of Q Stock were retained to act as pilot motor cars, for moving withdrawn stock to Ruislip depot for scrapping. One of the pilot motor cars, L127, ran down the slope from the depot towards Acton Town station on 10 October 1972, with nobody in it. Fortunately, there is a sand drag at the bottom of the slope, which stopped the car and prevented a serious incident. The vehicle and L126 remained in service as engineering stock until at least 1986.

Rolling stock on the District was replaced with D78 Stock from 1979. This was delivered to Ruislip depot, in a state where it was nearly ready for service, but final commissioning occurred at Ealing Common, and the vehicles could not be driven under their own power until this was done. Several displaced motor cars of CO/CP Stock were used as pilot motor cars, transferring a new train from Ruislip to Ealing Common, or a train for scrapping in the opposite direction. The pilot motor cars were used in pairs, one at each end of the train being transferred, and carried large stencils to indicate that they were not for scrapping. When these duties were completed, most of the pilot motor cars were also scrapped, but one motor car and an associated trailer car were moved from Ruislip depot to Quainton Road for preservation at the Buckinghamshire Railway Centre.

In recent years, the number of trains stored at the depot in order to provide the timetabled levels of service has increased. In 1978, there were normally 24 trains, although this was increased to 26, when the Earl's Court to Kensington (Olympia) exhibition service was required. By 1993, this number had increased to 29, and had increased again to 31 by 2002.

== Geography ==
The depot is accessed by road through a gate at the end of Granville Gardens, which joins the main A4020 Uxbridge Road just to the east of Ealing Common station. Access to the London Transport Museum Depot and its associated yard, which is located at the south-eastern corner of the main depot, is provided by a service road called Museum Way, which turns off the A4000 Gunnersbury Lane opposite Acton Town station. The museum building and yard are linked to the main depot by rail, but access is through a locked gate, for both rail vehicles and people.

== See also ==
- Lillie Bridge Depot
