= Thomas Hill (manufacturer) =

UK business

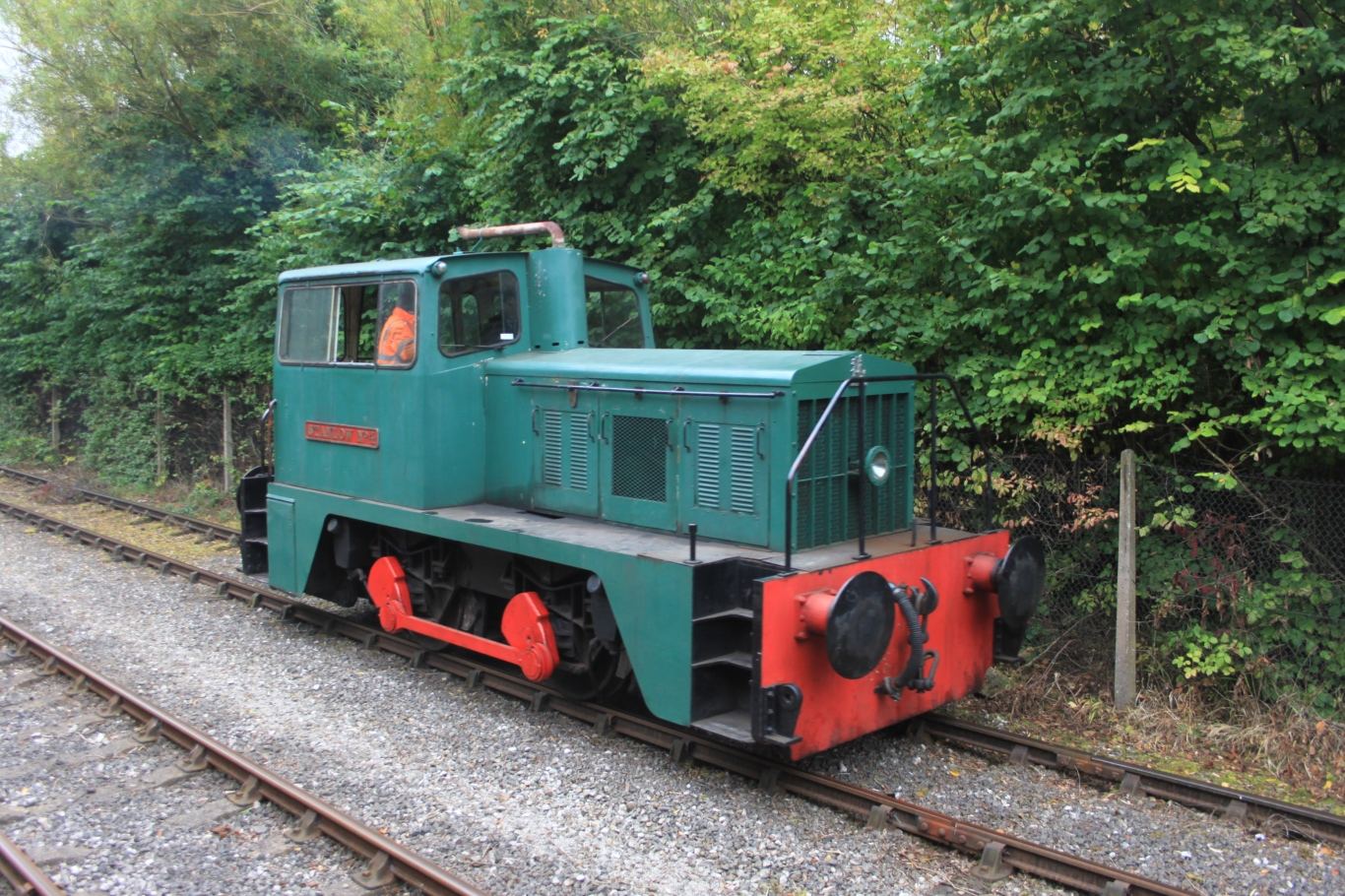
A Vanguard shunter built in 1966

Thomas Hill (Rotherham) Limited was a company which repaired and sold steam road vehicles, diesel and electric road vehicles and railway locomotives. It later made its name building and rebuilding diesel locomotives.

== History ==
The Company was founded by Mr. Thomas A. Hill in 1937 with small premises at Whiston, near Rotherham, and was principally concerned with repair and maintenance of steam road vehicles, and in particular Sentinel steam waggons which were popular in the area. The Company also became involved in battery electric vehicles built by Douglas (Kingswood) Limited, and was incorporated in 1942 as Thomas Hill (Steam and Electric Vehicles) Limited, TH(SEV).

Around this time the Sentinel company was developing a diesel-engined road vehicle fitted with a Sentinel horizontal diesel engine. This innovative vehicle attracted the attention of TH(SEV) and in 1946 an agency agreement were signed between the two companies. In 1946 the Company changed its name to Thomas Hill (Commercial Vehicles) Limited.

In 1947 Sentinel Waggon Works Ltd offered TH(SEV) to extend the agreement for diesel vehicles to include their range of steam locomotives and an agency was accepted by TH(SEV) for sales and servicing.

TH (SEV) were now engaged in sales and servicing of Sentinel diesel road vehicles, Sentinel steam road vehicles and Sentinel steam rail locomotives.

None of these vehicles where wholly conventional in their design and this presented a challenge to the salesman. Managers and engineer buying vehicles tended to be conservative and not only did they have to be convinced that this was the better way to do it but also that it was worth paying more money for the Sentinel products. It became clear that the best way to convince buyers was to demonstrate the appropriate vehicle in the buyer's own works carrying out the actual duties required. This became the general sales strategy for many years, and involved moving locomotives from site to site in the United Kingdom. The locomotives travelled on British Railways and under their own power where possible. The demonstrations created considerable interest, two locomotives, one 100 hp and one 200 hp were continuously employed moving from one site to another, particularly within the National Coal Board and Steel Works.

By 1950 the Sentinel locomotive franchise was considered by TH(SEV) to be the most important part of their business and whilst sales had been were rather slow to start, future prospects were good.

In 1952 18 locomotives were delivered, 12 being to the National Coal Board.

In 1953 the locomotive agreement was due for renewal. This was renewed but the diesel road vehicle agency was relinquished, with all efforts concentrated on the steam locomotive and battery electric vehicles.

To avoid confusing railway customers, in 1953 the Company changed its name again, this time to Thomas Hill (Rotherham) Limited, THR. In order to better entertain and impress the more senior executive from major commercial undertakings offices were taken at Effingham Chambers in the centre of Rotherham and occupied by the middle of 1953.

=== Diesel locomotives ===
Sales of Sentinel steam locos continued to grow peaking at 20 locomotives delivered in 1956. Despite the good sales turnover, THR was, by now, experiencing sales resistance to the steam locomotive and in conjunction with Sentinel (Shrewsbury) Ltd had developed an oil fired system for the 200 hp loco, ten of which were supplied to steel works in 1956.

The move to diesel locomotives started in 1956 with a temporary verbal agreement to sell 'Planet' locomotives built by F. C. Hibberd, on a commission basis to any non Hibberd customer. A new Planet loco was sold within a few weeks, the co-operation developed leading to a formal agreement was signed in April 1957.

The take over of Sentinel (Shrewsbury) Ltd by Rolls-Royce in 1956 for the manufacture of the Rolls-Royce diesel engines put the future locomotive production of any sort at Shrewsbury in doubt. Rolls-Royce had agreed to complete the steam locos on order, and four steam receiver locos ordered by Dorman Long in 1956, but only after much discuss did Rolls-Royce decide in 1957 to design and build a diesel locomotive of similar weight and power to the 200 hp steam locomotive. THR would assist in the design and development of these diesel machines and become the sole distributor.

In 1958 the last two Sentinel steam locos were delivered. The prototype Sentinel diesel loco was now in build and was to commence trials on the S & M Railway early 1959.

The prototype Sentinel operating on the S & M met with general approval from prospective customers and before the end of the year 17 locomotives had been sold and delivered. Production was geared up to complete four locomotives a month.

=== The Kilnhurst Works ===
THR had acquired the site of the closed Kilnhurst Central station of the Great Central Railway for a new works with rail access and this new works met with immediate success. Orders were obtained for the rebuilding of steam locomotives as diesel hydraulic machines in addition to a considerable amount of work transferred from the Whiston works. In consequence work was put in hand to double the size of the workshop.

In 1960 THR began to build a number of diesel locomotives. Based on Sentinel steam locomotive chassis dimensions they were powered by Rolls-Royce engines and called Vanguards.

The agreement with F.C Hibberd expired at the end of March 1960 and was not renewed. This was mainly because Hibberds believed that THR would sell the locomotives they built themselves in preference to the 'Planet' locomotives. The sale of Planet locos had averaged around eight locos per year. However, during 1960 THR completed four major steam to diesel conversions at Kilnhurst and seven in 1961 plus one new Vanguard loco, more than equating the lost Planet turnover.

New loco sales peaked in 1963 with 48 Sentinel locos and 12 Vanguards being delivered. Two locomotives, an 0-4-0 and an 0-6-0 were constantly employed on demonstration particularly in steel works.

=== THR becomes Rolls-Royce subsidiary ===
In 1962, negotiations were started with Rolls-Royce Ltd to take a financial interest in THR. These negotiations were concluded in April 1963 with Rolls-Royce Ltd taking a 51% controlling interest and THR became a subsidiary of Rolls-Royce, Diesel Engine Division, Shrewsbury.

Also in the early 1960s, it became known that United Steel Companies (USC) were to close their wheel and axle works, 'Baker and Bessemer' at Kilnhurst, and discussions regarding this matter between THR and USC revealed that the Yorkshire Engine Company, YEC locomotive business might be disposed of. Rolls-Royce opened negotiations with United Steels which continued throughout 1964 and finally in 1965 Rolls-Royce acquired the stock and goodwill of YEC and all locomotive production at Meadow Hall ceased. Three diesel hydraulic locomotives in stock at YEC, together with a consignment of spare parts were transferred to THR. Rolls-Royce undertook to build any future YEC diesel electric locomotives that might be required. Three Janus locomotives for USC at Scunthorpe plus one smaller locomotive for GEC and a similar powered diesel-electric for Zambia. Rolls-Royce insisted at that time in dealing with any export enquiries direct, a process that did not work and no further YEC design locomotives were built.

THR was able to make money by supplying parts for YEC locomotives and carrying out repairs and maintenance work. The THR service department now had two full-time representatives on the road selling parts and service agreements. The sudden addition of around 700 locomotives to the potential market in the UK provided a great boost, although frustrated for some years by a policy laid down by Rolls-Royce that THR must supply diesel engine spares only for Sentinel and Vanguard locos and refer all Yorkshire locomotive users to Cripps (the Rolls-Royce main distributor) for engine parts.

=== Falling Sales ===
The market for new locomotives in the UK showed a downturn since 1963 as far as the Sentinel was concerned. Unfortunately British Railways, started selling off redundant shunting and trip locomotives. This process was to continue for many years and damaged the sales of many locomotive builders. The new Sentinel 'Steelman' design of locomotive was all but killed off by these sales.

UK sales of Sentinel locos were now less than 10 per year, their only overseas success had been to license the build of 36 0-6-0 locomotives for the railways in Portugal in 1965/6. Other than the one loco for Zambia, no Yorkshire locomotives had been sold overseas despite many tenders.

On the other hand, THR was building around 15 new 0-6-0 "Vanguard" locos per year. This arrangement had been agreed by Rolls-Royce in respect of the 0-4-0s but THR were selling 0-4-0s in tandem and even "tridem" which Rolls-Royce considered was to the detriment of Sentinel 0-6-0 and 0-8-0 sales. In addition a number of 0-6-0 "specials" had also been built by THR.

Rolls-Royce were not happy about the future of the locomotive business at Shrewsbury. They were geared for batch building and the days of bulk orders in the UK were virtually over. Serious talking now began to transfer the whole of the locomotive business to THR. Such transfer would also require capitalization by Rolls-Royce and many people needed convincing that it would be a worthwhile investment. With the matter in final stages of agreement came the financial crisis of Rolls-Royce Ltd in 1971.

THR experienced considerable difficulty with their suppliers during the coming months despite the public declarations by the newly formed Rolls-Royce Motors (of which the Diesel Division and THR were associated) that it was very much alive and well.

The dust having settled, in 1972 THR formally acquired the Rolls-Royce locomotive business and Rolls-Royce Motors increased its holding in the Company. Whilst only now was the transfer of the locomotive business formally concluded, in practice the last Sentinel locomotive was delivered in March 1971, with only three the previous year, and in the same two years the Company built and delivered both 0-4-0 and 0-6-0 Vanguard locos, including three 0-4-0 locos to Indonesia. These were the first Vanguard locos to be exported and were to the order of Shell Petroleum at The Hague.

In January 1975 Mr. T. A. Hill the founder of the Company and his co-founder and the Company Secretary Mr. A. Birks resigned and retired (but continued with a minority shareholding). A new board of directors was formed and for the first time Rolls-Royce appointed one of their own directors, Mr G. R. (Roy) Torrance, as non executive Company Chairman. It soon became clear that Rolls-Royce intended to play a closer role in determining the policies of the Company than they had done in the past.

With the formation of the new board of Directors (including Derek Harper (Managing) and Thomas W Hill (Engineering and son of Thomas A Hill)) and the appointment for the first time of a Sales Director (John Capes), the Company took the decision to actively seek overseas business, whereas in the past it had tended to "look the other way", except for such business which might be negotiated within the UK., and a budget, albeit a very limited one, was allocated to overseas sales promotion. Following a number of overseas tours by the Sales Director it was accepted that a potential market for our class of equipment existed in a number of countries in Africa and the Far East and it was agreed that the Company would engage a full-time overseas representative with suitable experience and management potential to promote overseas sales, and to develop an export department.

It was now 15 or 16 years since the start of production of Sentinel and Vanguard locomotives, and major overhaul or complete refurbishment was required on many of the early machines. Capital expenditure was being restricted by many companies but particularly by the British Steel Corporation and the National Coal Board, so the marketing department concentrated on these customers offering a complete service for refurbishing to "as new" standards. This business proved very lucrative and extended the life of Sentinel and Vanguard locomotives ensuring a continuing demand for the spares.

One particularly interesting project was the rebuilding of two Vanguard 0-6-0 55 ton locos for BSC Tinsley Park Works which included the installation of radio control operated by a portable transmitter carried by the driver and capable of operation with a range of up to 130 ft. Radio equipment was supplied by Telemotive. Both locomotives are still in satisfactory operation (in 1984) and have given remarkably little trouble.

Despite capital restrictions new Vanguard locomotives were still being sold and in 1976 two 25 ton Vanguards were exported to Nigeria and two 20 ton locos to Nauru.

Deliveries during 1977 amounted to seven new locomotives, six of which were to the Ministry of Defence, and seven major rebuilds, three of them being 0-6-0. This was quite a good effort out of one small workshop and was to be the last full year under these restricted conditions.

Numerous discussions had taken place over the previous months on possible extensions to the factory to cope with the work now being quoted for. Local steelworks in particular had Sentinel locos which urgently required rebuilding and the company was in danger of losing some, if not all, of this work to its competitors unless a reasonable turn round period could be offered.

Rolls-Royce had accepted that further investment in workshop extensions was necessary and several plans for small "add-ons" were under consideration.

Eventually a decision was taken to build complete new workshops on the site of the Kilnhurst Station building and adjoining the existing shop, which would in total, treble the main workshop area and provide a new purpose designed paint shop. The final go ahead was given at the end of 1977 and work commenced the following January with Alfred McAlpine as the main contractor, and completion scheduled for the end of June 1978.

The new workshops were formally opened by Edward Wainwright MP for Dearne Valley on 18 August 1978. THR now had workshop space and facilities to meet the demand experienced during the previous two or three years.

Unfortunately the industry was now showing signs of a downturn in both new and refurbished locos, and price became the all-important factor to prospective buyers. THR had rarely, if ever, won business on price. However, the situation in the petroleum industry was more encouraging, there was a move to use more rail transport and heavier trains. THR had a good relationship with most of these people having previously supplied locomotives to Shell, BP, Lindsey Oil Refinery etc. and had developed a good water exhaust gas quencher. This time Shell was asking for much more to satisfy the new more stringent OCCMA standards, and also a battery electric starter system which would have to carry a Buxton Approval Certificate. The order was to be for four locos and after Some discussion it was decided that we should quote against this requirement.

The order was won by the Company for four chain drive 40 ton 0-4-0 locos, despite our quotation being the highest of four UK and one French tender. It should here be recorded that Shell engineers stated that they had recommended acceptance of the THR tender for three major reasons:

a) THR provided a first class after sales service for their two Vanguard locomotives over a number of years.

b) THR currently had one Vanguard 37 ton 0-4-0 chain drive locomotive and a similar Vanguard 45 ton rod coupled. Their experience with these machines had indicated a strong preference for chain drive.

c) They required tandem operation and THR had considerable experience with such systems.

The four locomotives were delivered to Shell at Stanford le Hope, three in 1978 one in 1979. The development of the flame proof certified equipment, particularly battery starting, gave us a temporary lead over our competitors and enabled us to secure further orders for refinery locos from Mobil, Shell Stanlow, BP Grangemouth, and BP Isle of Grain.

The Mobil locomotive was THR's first departure from the outside frame design, and inevitably some early problems were experienced. The locomotive weighed 70 tons on three axles and was powered by the Rolls-Royce DV8N naturally aspirated engine. This locomotive was followed by two similar machines at 60 tons weight to BP Isle Of Grain.

The decision to develop the flame proof equipment and go all out for the Shell business had proved to be a good one. In less than three years 10 locomotives with the new flameproof equipment, valued at over £l.5 million had been sold, built and delivered.

The merger of Rolls-Royce Motors Ltd with Vickers in June 1980 caused some surprise at THR generally but little real concern. The company had quoted Vickers on more than one occasion for locomotives as part of a Vickers tender package, and to be part of that Group may be of benefit to the company, certainly attempts were made to exploit the situation where opportunities arose. egrettably no actual locomotive business materialised from that quarter during the comparatively short period of association.

The company was now part of the Vickers Engineering Group and trading as a "Vickers Company". Overseas, the new image may have slightly improved our marketing strength but the change meant little in the home market. THR was now well established as a leading manufacturer of locomotives in its own right, and its parent company, whilst important, was certainly not paramount to its continued success, as it may have been almost 20 years earlier when Rolls-Royce took over.

=== Varlen ===
In 1982 the company was approached by the Varlen Corporation of Illinois USA to discuss the matter of a licence agreement enabling Varlen to build the Vanguard locomotives in the United States. Numerous discussions were held over the following months. Varlen became very enthusiastic and were convinced of great potential for these machines in their home markets. An agreement was signed between Varlen and THR at in May 1982. Part of the agreement was for THR to supply one rebuilt Steelman locomotive (ex BSC) and two new locomotives for demonstration purposes. The new locomotives were to be redesigned to meet all the requirements of U.S. Railroads. In February 1983 the rebuilt and modified Steelman loco was shipped to the USA, followed in July by the first new machine, a much modified loco based on the Ministry of Defence 35 ton 0-4-0. The company had been very proud in being selected by a very substantial American corporation who wished to build our products under licence and it came as a very big disappointment when toward the end of 1983 Varlen announced their intention to withdraw from the agreement.

The President of Varlen, the instigator of the proposals to build new locos, and the motivator throughout, retired suddenly due to ill health. His successor had different ideas, and in 1984 the matter was settled out of court between Varlen and Vickers, who had assumed responsibility for THR.

=== Sale of THR to Resco ===
Efforts were still being made to by the Company to obtain overseas business and many tenders were submitted, mainly for bogie type diesel electric machines which still required design and development.

Unfortunately, Group pricing policy coupled with the need to recover such design and development charges over too few locomotives, forced up THR's prices resulting in uncompetitive and unsuccessful tendering.

Meanwhile, Vickers had made it known that they wished to divest themselves of several of their smaller companies that did not fit into their future plans, THR was to be one of those companies.

In February 1984 all the shares, stock and goodwill of THR were purchased by the Hunter Group of Companies, for administration by their existing railway company, Resco (Railways) Limited. The Thomas Hill name continued to be used after the purchase by Hunter Group.

=== Sale of THR to RFS Industries ===
On 30 June 1989 the company was sold again, this time to RFS Engineering. RFS were already operating at the old BR Doncaster Works. The Thomas Hill name was dropped, but developments of TH designs continued to be produced. RFS’s first seven locos (narrow gauge locos for the channel tunnel contract) were numbered into their own scheme, thereafter works numbers of locos continued TH’s numbering.

Kilnhust Works closed during 1993. Stock and work were transferred to RFS’s Doncaster Works by August 1993. The final loco (CRACOE, for Tilcon, Grassington, N Yorks) was built at Doncaster as RFS Doncaster went into receivership. In 1998 RFS was acquired by Westinghouse Air Brake Company and in 2000 was renamed Wabtec Rail Limited. Wabtec has retained the IPR in the Thomas Hill and Sentinel ranges of locomotives.

== Locomotives ==
After building 'specials' and rebuilding existing locomotives, THR started building their own locomotives. When Rolls-Royce closed its locomotive business, THR took their place in the market place with similar but improved locomotives.

=== Sentinel Rebuilds ===
Thomas Hill rebuilt various 4w Sentinel vertical boilered steam locos into diesel locos. They removed the steam equipment and superstructure, added new buffer beams, shunters recesses steps and side skirts. Above the running plates, new superstructures housed either a 6-cylinder Rolls-Royce engine, torque converter and gearbox (100 hp Sentinel steam locos, classed at TH as "1SDC" – steam-to-diesel conversion) or the 8-cylinder Rolls – (200 hp Sentinel steamer, classed as 2"SDC"). One of these engines, 103c "Megan" and another quite similar (111c) can be found at the Foxfield Railway These locos were allocated works numbers with a 'c' suffix ('c' for conversion).

=== Fowler Rebuilds ===
Thomas Hill rebuilt nearly a dozen Fowler 0-4-0 diesel mechanical locos as 0-4-0DH, retaining the frame, running gear and some of the bodywork, fitting new engine and transmission and engine cover. These locos also were allocated works numbers with a 'c' suffix. A batch of 5 were ordered by the MoD – but trials with the first two failed to meet their specified tractive efforts (the original locos were plain bearings whereas TH had calculated assuming roller bearings) and although accepting that they were far superior to the Fowler original, the MoD cancelled the balance of the order.

=== Vanguards ===
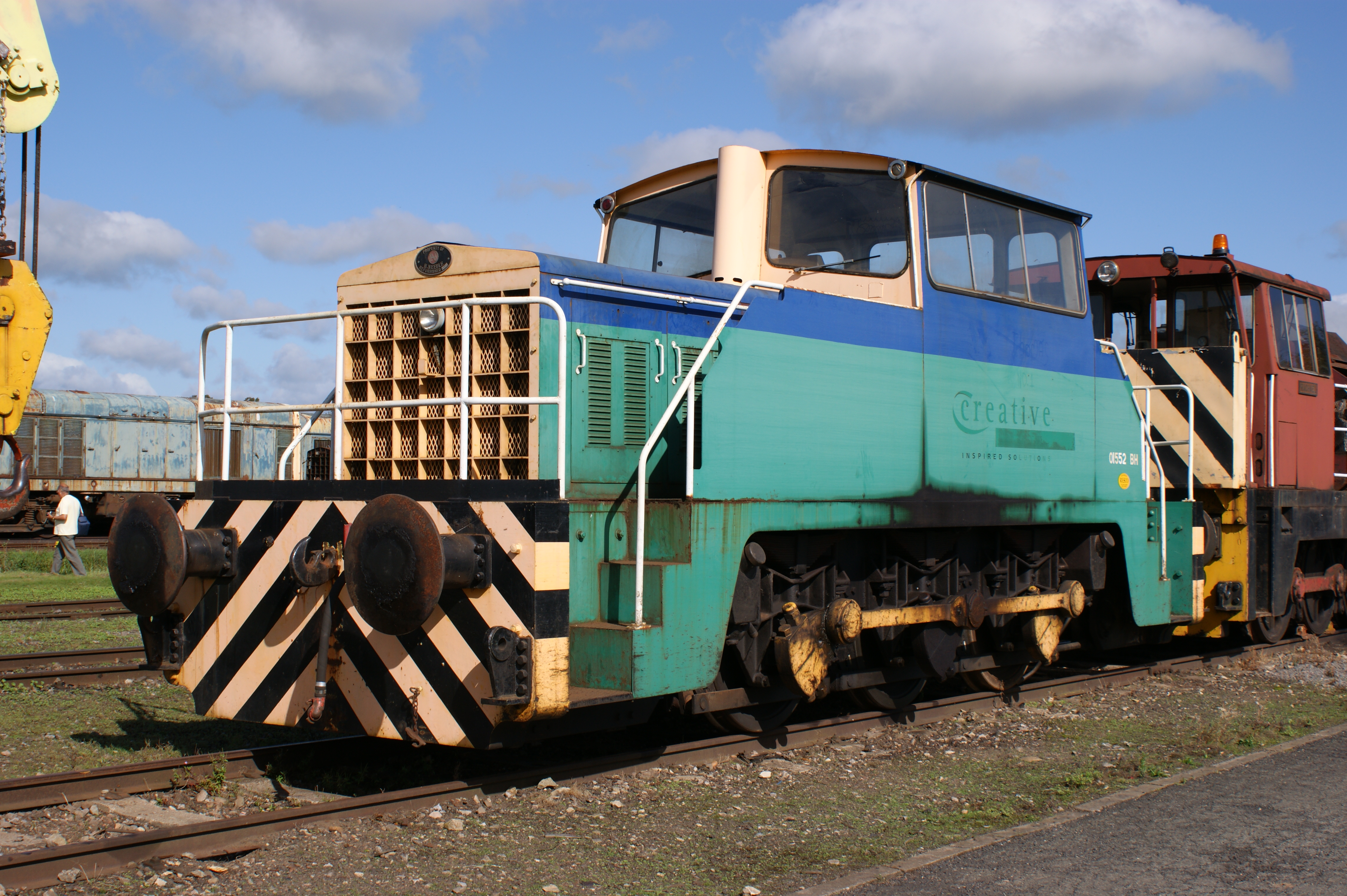
Vanguard 0-4-0

THR was building around 15 new 0-6-0 "Vanguard" locos per year. This arrangement had been agreed by Rolls-Royce in respect of the 0-4-0s but THR were selling 0-4-0s in tandem and even "tridem" which RR considered was to the detriment of Sentinel 0-6-0 and 0-8-0 sales. In addition a number of 0-6-0 specials had also been built by THR.

In 1975, the most interesting prospect for new locomotives was the Ministry of Defence (MOD). For several years they had talked about a replacement programme for their "M" type locos, now it really was going to happen. This was prestige business and competition would be strong. A considerable effort had been made during the previous two years to convince the MOD of the advantages of the Vanguard design well in advance of their enquiry in the hopes of influencing their specification. The strategy paid off and the company was awarded the contract for six locomotives in 1976. These machines proved very suited to the Ministry requirements and three such contracts have now been completed making 18 identical locomotives now in Service.

In May 1978, H.M. the Queen, during a visit to Bicester Army Depot, formally named a Vanguard locomotive "Conductor". THR executives were invited to attend the ceremony.

=== Titan ===
A notable project of the early 1970s was the Vanguard Titan locomotive built for BSC Middlesbrough. The Titan was a rigid frame 0-6-0 loco of 75 (nominal) tons weight. The prototype delivered in August 1972 had two C6T engines with a total rating of 556 BHP. Three subsequent locos which followed at the end of the year were fitted with two C8T engines, total rating 700 BHP. Initially these locomotives proved very satisfactory employed on the heavy ore trains, and five more locos were ordered.

Problems began in 1974 with a number of failures resulting in all Titan locos being out of service producing a lack of confidence by BSC which threatened cancellation of the outstanding order. The ability of the locomotives to perform their duties very satisfactorily, and the determined efforts to overcome the problems made by the Company, restored confidence and the order stood. Five Titan locos were delivered to BSC Middlesbrough in 1975. When Middlesbrough replaced the locos with 75ton GECs, the Titans were transferred to BSC Ravenscraig.

=== Underground Personnel Carriers ===
In 1976 a Heads of Agreement was signed with the National Coal Board to design and develop a narrow gauge battery electric underground personnel carrier.

The vehicle was to seat 4/6 people and was intended primarily for the colliery manager or other officials to use on their daily inspection visits underground. Control had to be simple so that little tuition was required and the vehicle could be safely driven by virtually anyone. Such a vehicle to carry six people was designed and built and, after some considerable delay in approvals by mines inspectorate etc., the prototype termed UPC (Underground Personnel Carrier) was put into service at Bates Colliery in 1977. From the point of view of the initial requirement it was a complete success, but areas for improvement were recognised and incorporated in the 10 production models planned.

Unfortunately the vehicle was still classed as non essential to production and was dubbed as the managers Rolls-Royce by men at the pit. It was not until December 1979 that the first actual production UPC was sold, ex stock, to Thoresby Colliery in the North Notts Area

The second UPC was used to a greater extent as a general-purpose vehicle which quickly set the pace for further development and little more than two years later, a 24-seater version based on two of the original units with one cab removed and an 18-seat gondola between them, was delivered to Thoresby Colliery. This unit train as it was called, operated well, but again the NCB came up with a number of minor changes and additions which they would like to have made on any future models, which would have had a longer gondola to seat 24. Unfortunately the Miners Strike early in 1984 interrupted plans for further development of this vehicle and no more progress was made.

=== Valiants ===
Valiants were "remanufactures" using 0-6-0DH Sentinel locos as a base, with some of the superstructure but with strengthened frames, new cabs and control systems. The first two, for Blue Circle Hope, were under-specified and revealed the shortcomings of their Rolls-Royce C8TFL engine, and although spending some months in traffic in 1987-8, resulted in a dispute between BCI and TH and ultimately their replacement with the unique 80ton B-B "Blue John" from Hunslet-Barclay. Further Valiants were built, but all received the Cummins 14-litre (NTA855) engine, which was proving much superior in the MoD Steelman locos.

=== Steelman ===
The Steelman is a six-wheel shaft drive loco of 450 to 750 bhp. The first Steelman (Rolls Royce works number 10265) utilised the Rolls-Royce DV8TCA rated at 608 bhp at 1800 rpm and utilised a 2-speed "warm change" Wiseman transfer gearbox, giving the loco a top speed of 40 mph. The follow-on 4 locos – 3 with the Rolls-Royce DV8N (445 bhp) at 52tons and one with the DV8TCE (650 bhp) at 60tons – had re-designed bodywork and single speed transfer gearboxes. All five went to the British Steel Corporation. Rolls expected to develop 2-axle versions to replace the Sentinel models but the sale of Class 14 locos from BR adversely affected the market and without the volume of sales, higher unit costs precluded further development. Following Rolls-Royce's exit from loco building Thomas Hill took over the design, though resistance to it from Thomas Hill (senior) prevented it being offered until long after he'd retired, hence the regressive "Titan" design. The first two TH Steelman locos were built for ICI in 1984, and a sales drive within British Steel Ravenscraig resulted in their taking both the original 60Ton Steelman and the last of the production batch (Rolls Royce works number 10277), which had meantime been the Varlen USA demonstrator and returned. Subsequently, Ravenscraig bought 2 new Steelman 60T 6w's using the Cat 3412, which power unit was also installed into the final 6 wheel Steelman - a 75ton version for ARC Whatley Quarry (Thomas Hill works number 325v).

Meantime TH offered a 4 wheel version of the Steelman loco on foreign and domestic enquiries – eventually winning an order for 9 for the MoD in 1986-7. HM the Queen named one of these at MoD Bicester (she had also named an earlier chain-drive Vanguard). Offering a rubber-suspension loco as a "tripper" however was not acceptable to overseas railway authorities, so a coil-spring version was proposed, to be designated a "Steelman Rapide", leaving the rubber-sprung original as the "Steelman Royale".

After TH was absorbed by RFS, two "Steelman" locos were produced, but owe little to the original designs, being a 67ton 6w'er for Concoco, and a 150ton 12w'er for Tilcon, Grassington.
