= Stamford Brook tube station =

London Underground station

Stamford Brook
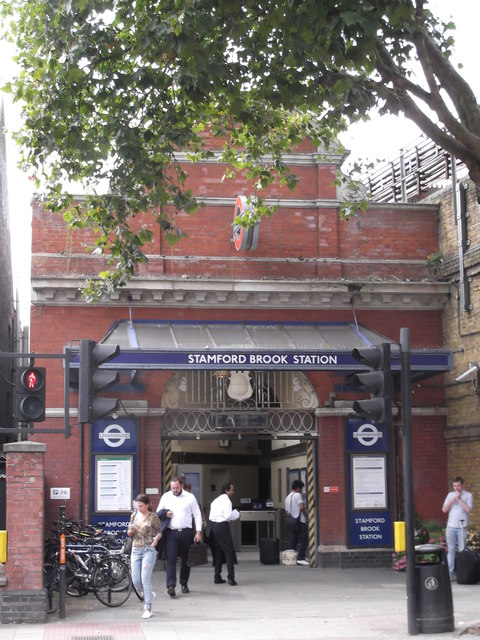
- Station entrance
- Interactive map of Stamford Brook

General information
- Location: Chiswick
- Local authority: London Borough of Hounslow
- Managed by: London Underground
- Number of platforms: 3 (2 active, 1 inactive)
- Fare zone: 2

London Underground annual entry and exit
- 2020: ▼1.32 million
- 2021: ▼1.22 million
- 2022: ▲2.11 million
- 2023: ▲2.13 million
- 2024: ▲2.27 million

Railway companies
- Original company: London and South Western Railway

Key dates
- 1 January 1869: Line opened
- 1 February 1912: Station opened
- 3 June 1916: L&SWR service ceased

Other information
- External links: TfL station info page
- Coordinates: 51.49500°N 0.24583°W

Stamford Brook is a London Underground station on the eastern edge of Chiswick in west London. It is on the District line, between Turnham Green and Ravenscourt Park stations. The main entrance is located on Goldhawk Road (A402) with a secondary entrance on Prebend Gardens. It is in London fare zone 2.

The station takes its name from Stamford Brook, a tributary of the River Thames that is now predominantly underground. The Piccadilly line uses the inside tracks, but does not stop here except in the westbound direction on rare occasions.

== History ==
The line through Stamford Brook station was opened on 1 January 1869 by the London and South Western Railway (L&SWR) on a new branch line to Richmond from the West London Joint Railway starting north of Addison Road station (now Kensington (Olympia)). The line ran through Shepherd's Bush and Hammersmith via a now closed curve. Initially there were no stations between Grove Road station in Hammersmith (also now closed) and Turnham Green.

From its opening, a number of services operated over the route to Richmond in addition to the L&SWR including:

- District Railway (DR, now the District line) from 1 June 1877
- Great Western Railway, briefly in 1870 and from 1894 to 1910
- Metropolitan Railway (now the Metropolitan line), from 1877 to 1906

By 1 February 1912 when the station opened, only L&SWR and the DR still operated on the line and on 3 June 1916 the L&SWR withdrew its own service leaving the District Railway as the sole operator.

In the early 1930s, the London Electric Railway, precursor of the London Underground and owner of the District and Piccadilly lines, began the reconstruction of the tracks between Hammersmith and Acton Town to enable the Piccadilly line to be extended from Hammersmith to Uxbridge and Hounslow West (then the terminus of what is now the Heathrow branch). Express non-stop tracks were provided for the Piccadilly line between the stopping lines of the District line. Services on the Piccadilly line began running through Stamford Brook on 4 July 1932.

Originally, the station had an island platform with District line trains serving one side in each direction. However, with the introduction of the Piccadilly line tracks, the eastbound District line track became the westbound Piccadilly line track and a new platform was built for the eastbound District line. This is why there is one island platform and one side platform serving three tracks; the eastbound Piccadilly line track is the only track that is unable to serve the station.

On 5 January 1964 an automatic ticket barrier was installed at the station at a cost of around £1000 (equivalent to £18,000 in 2025). It was the first such barrier to be installed anywhere on the London Underground. The ticket-checking device itself was simplistic, optically scanning a printed ternary code on each ticket to check for validity, and had a theoretical maximum throughput of 30 tickets per minute. Nonetheless, the device was seen as a large improvement over staffed barriers with staff checking tickets, and the experiment was expanded to other local stations Chiswick Park and Ravenscourt Park.

== Connections ==
London Buses route 237 serves the station directly, while routes 110, 190, 267, H91 and night bus route N9 run along Chiswick High Road and King Street, about 300 yards south of the station.

Preceding station	London Underground	Following station
Turnham Green towards Ealing Broadway or Richmond	District line	Ravenscourt Park towards Upminster or High Street Kensington
Former services
Turnham Green towards Richmond	London and South Western Railway (1869–1916)	Ravenscourt Park towards West Brompton
Abandoned Plans
Preceding station	London Underground	Following station
Turnham Green towards Richmond	Central line (1920)	Ravenscourt Park towards Liverpool Street
