= Gunnersbury station =

London Underground and London Overground station

Gunnersbury
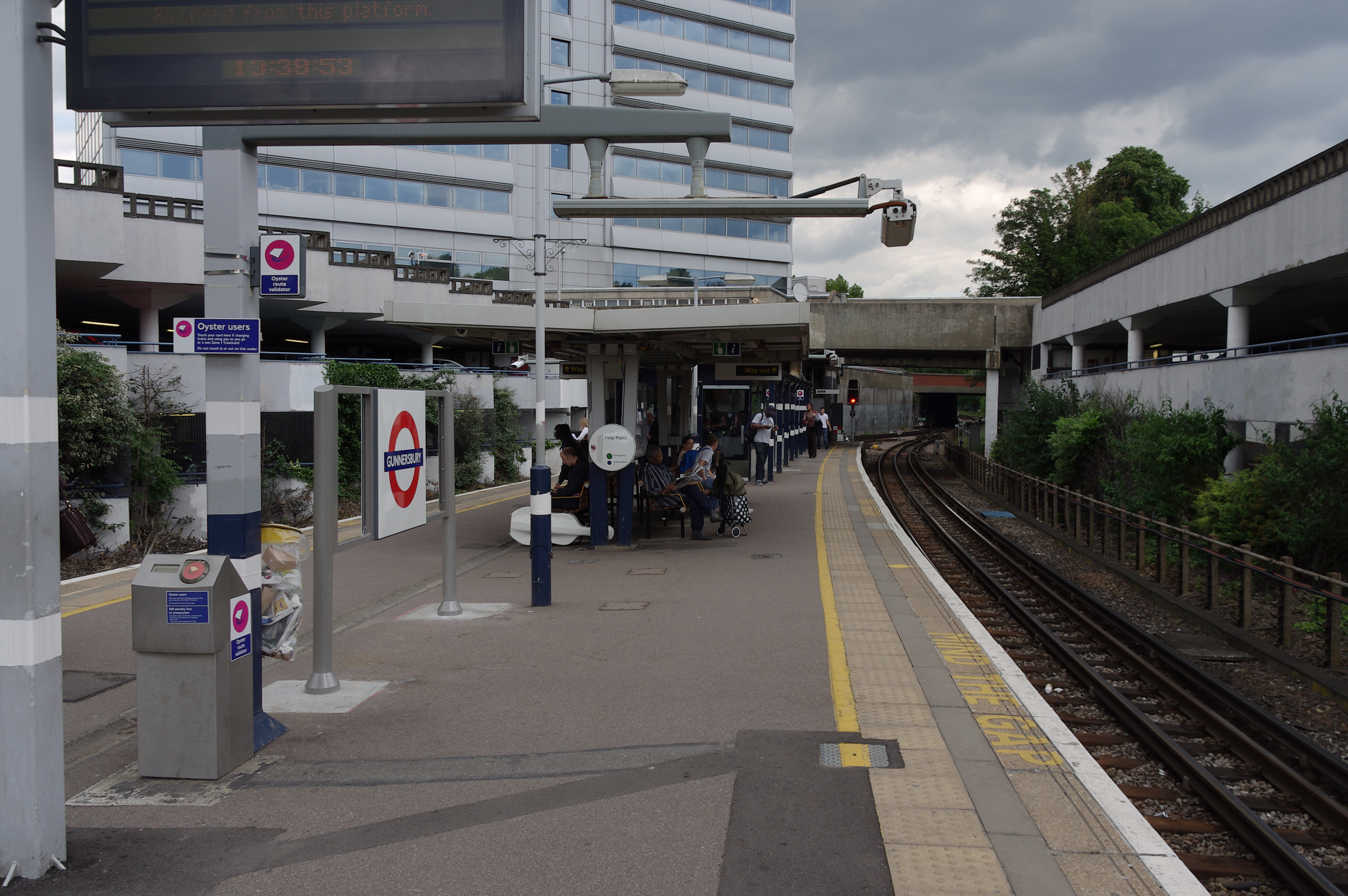
- North-east bound view of District line station platforms as seen in June 2012
- Interactive map of Gunnersbury

General information
- Location: Gunnersbury
- Local authority: London Borough of Hounslow
- Managed by: London Underground
- Owner: Network Rail
- Station code: GUN
- DfT category: D
- Number of platforms: 2
- Fare zone: 3

London Underground annual entry and exit
- 2020: ▼2.18 million
- 2021: ▼1.97 million
- 2022: ▲3.87 million
- 2023: ▲4.05 million
- 2024: ▼3.85 million

National Rail annual entry and exit
- 2020–21: ▼0.664 million
- 2021–22: ▲1.318 million
- 2022–23: ▲1.776 million
- 2023–24: ▲2.017 million
- 2024–25: ▼1.962 million

Key dates
- 1 January 1869: Opened (L&SWR)
- 1 January 1869: Started (NLR)
- 1870: Started and Ended (GWR)
- 1 June 1877: Started (MR and DR)
- 1 January 1894: Started (GWR)
- 31 December 1906: Ended (MR)
- 31 December 1910: Ended (GWR)
- 1916: Ended (L&SWR)

Other information
- External links: TfL station info page; Departures; Facilities
- Coordinates: 51.4918°N 0.275°W

Gunnersbury (/ˈɡʌnərzbəri/) is an interchange station in Gunnersbury, London, situated on the District line of the London Underground and the Mildmay line of the London Overground. The station is located off Chiswick High Road (A315) and opened on 1 January 1869.

The station is located in London fare zone 3. On the District line, the station is between Turnham Green and Kew Gardens; and on the Mildmay line, it is between South Acton and Kew Gardens.

== History ==
The station was opened as Brentford Road on 1 January 1869 by the London and South Western Railway (L&SWR) on a new branch line to Richmond built from the West London Joint Railway starting north of Addison Road station (now Kensington (Olympia)). The line ran through Shepherd's Bush and Hammersmith via a now closed curve and Grove Road station in Hammersmith (also now closed). A short connection was also made from the North & South Western Junction Railway (N&SWJR) line to Brentford meeting the L&SWR line immediately north of the station. This line was served by the North London Railway (NLR).

Brentford Road station originally had four platforms; two on the line to Richmond and two serving a loop (the Chiswick Curve) which connected to the line through Kew Bridge station.

Between 1 June 1870 and 31 October 1870 the Great Western Railway (GWR) briefly ran services from Paddington to Richmond via Hammersmith & City Railway (now the Hammersmith & City line) tracks to Grove Road then on the L&SWR tracks through Gunnersbury.

The station was given its current name in 1871.

On 1 June 1877, the District Railway (DR, now the District line) opened a short extension from its terminus at Hammersmith to connect to the L&SWR tracks east of Ravenscourt Park station. The DR then began running trains over the L&SWR tracks to Richmond. On 1 October 1877, the Metropolitan Railway (MR, now the Metropolitan line) restarted the GWR's former service to Richmond via Grove Road station.

The DR's service between Richmond, Hammersmith and central London was more direct than the NLR's route via Willesden Junction, the L&SWR's or the MR's routes via Grove Road station or the L&SWR's other route from Richmond via Clapham Junction. From 1 January 1894, the GWR began sharing the MR's Richmond service and served Gunnersbury once again, meaning that passengers from Gunnersbury could travel on the services of five operators.

Following the electrification of the DR's own tracks north of Acton Town in 1903, the DR funded the electrification of the tracks through Gunnersbury. The tracks on the Richmond branch were electrified on 1 August 1905. Whilst DR services were operated with electric trains, the L&SWR, NLR, GWR and MR services continued to be steam hauled.

MR services were withdrawn on 31 December 1906 and GWR services were withdrawn on 31 December 1910 leaving operations at Gunnersbury to the DR (by then known as the District Railway), the NLR and L&SWR. By 1916, the L&SWR's route through Hammersmith was being out-competed by the District to such a degree that the L&SWR withdrew its service between Richmond and Addison Road on 3 June 1916, leaving the District as the sole operator over that route.

In 1932, the Chiswick Curve was closed and the tracks were later removed. The site of the curve is now a housing estate known as Chiswick Village.

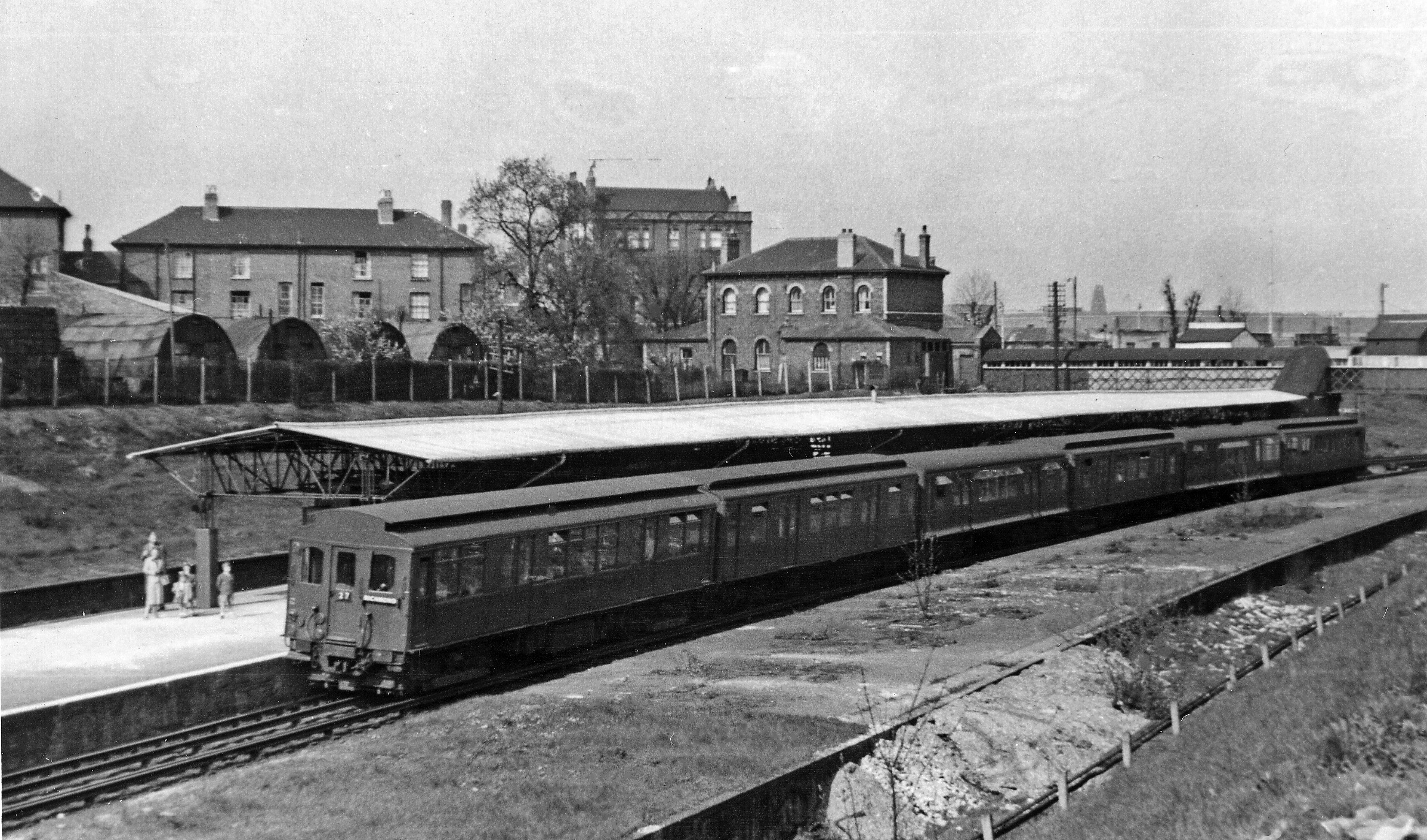
District line train for Richmond in 1955

On 8 December 1954 the station was damaged by an F3 tornado which ripped off the roof and injured six people.

In the 1960s the station was redeveloped with just the two platforms it currently possesses. The London Overground and London Underground services share the same tracks.

== Services ==
Gunnersbury currently has the following London Overground (Mildmay line) and London Underground (District line) services, which are operated by Class 378 and S7 Stock trains respectively:

London Underground

Off-peak:

- 6tph to Upminster
- 6tph to Richmond

London Overground

Off-peak (including Sundays):

- 4tph to Stratford
- 4tph to Richmond

== Arrangement ==
London Underground is classed as an open access operator between Richmond and Acton Lane Junction with LU purchasing individual slots on the North London line from Network Rail.

== Connections ==
London Buses routes 110, 237, 267, 440, H91 and night route N9 serve the station.

Preceding station	London Overground	Following station
Kew Gardens towards Richmond	Mildmay line North London line	South Acton towards Stratford
Preceding station	London Underground	Following station
Kew Gardens towards Richmond	District line Richmond branch	Turnham Green towards Upminster
Former services
Kew Gardens towards Richmond	London and South Western Railway (1869–1916)	Turnham Green towards West Brompton
Kew Gardens towards Richmond	Metropolitan Railway (1877–1906)	Turnham Green towards Paddington
Kew Gardens towards Richmond	Great Western Railway (1894–1910)	Turnham Green towards Paddington
