= Ravenscourt Park =

Park in Hammersmith, London

- Ravenscourt Park next to Paddenswick Road Gate
- Interactive map of Ravenscourt Park
- Type: Municipal park
- Location: Hammersmith, London, England, UK
- Coordinates: 51°29′48.1″N 0°14′20.4″W
- Area: 8.3 hectares (21 acres)
- Created: 1888
- Operator: Hammersmith and Fulham Borough Council
- Open: All year
- Website: https://www.lbhf.gov.uk/arts-and-parks/parks-and-open-spaces/ravenscourt-park

Ravenscourt Park is an 8.3 hectares (21 acres) public park and garden located in the London Borough of Hammersmith and Fulham, England. It is one of the Borough's flagship parks, having won a Green Flag Award. Stamford Brook and Ravenscourt Park tube stations are close by.

== History ==
The origins of Ravenscourt Park lie in the medieval manor and estate of Palingswick (or Paddenswick) Manor, located on the site and first recorded in the 12th century. The historic name still exists today in the name of Paddenswick Road, which runs along the north east boundary of the park.

=== Medieval origins ===
By the 13th century the manor house was a mansion surrounded by a moat fed by the Stamford Brook. The lake in the centre of the park today is a remnant of the original moat.

King Edward III’s mistress Alice Perrers lived in the manor during the 14th century.

=== 17th and 18th centuries ===
The manor house was rebuilt in 1650 and in 1747 it was sold to Thomas Corbett who named it Ravenscourt, probably derived from the raven in his coat of arms, which was itself a pun on his name as corbeau is French for raven.

=== 19th century ===
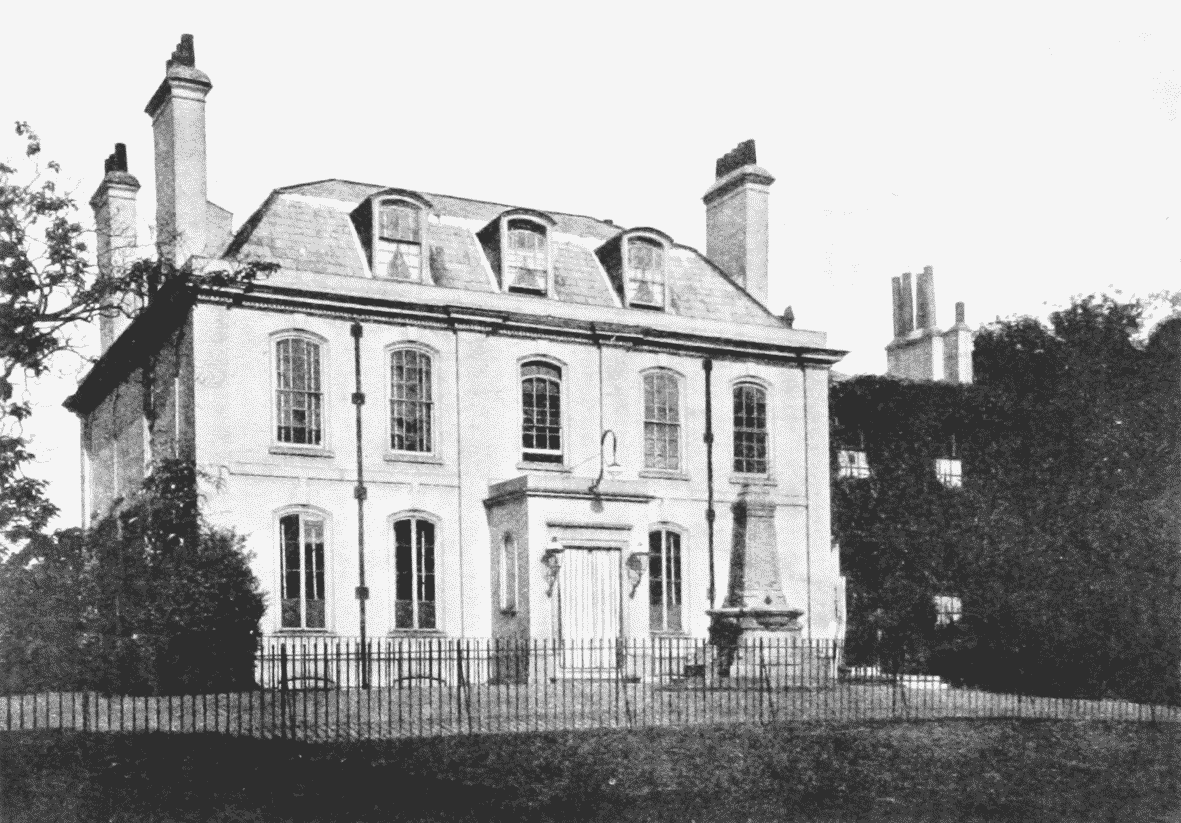
Ravenscourt Park House, photographed in 1915

In 1812 the Ravenscourt House and estate were bought by its final private owner, George Scott, a builder and philanthropist who developed nearby St Peter’s Square. Scott employed leading landscaper Humphry Repton to lay out the gardens of the estate, and encouraged the building of houses along its edges. According to a park plan from 1830, there were 78 houses within the park, and by 1845 this number had risen to 330.

The first public library in Hammersmith at Ravenscourt House was opened by John Lubbock, 1st Baron Avebury on 19 March 1890.

=== Sale, development and public ownership ===
In 1887, the Scott family sold the estate to a developer for building purposes, to be covered, it was said, with working-class dwellings. Counterproposals to prevent this, either by repurchasing the property by public subscription or by appealing for public purchase by the Metropolitan Board of Works, both failed, largely owing to the exorbitant price – said to be well over £70,000 (equivalent to £7,957,887 in 2025) demanded by the new freeholder.

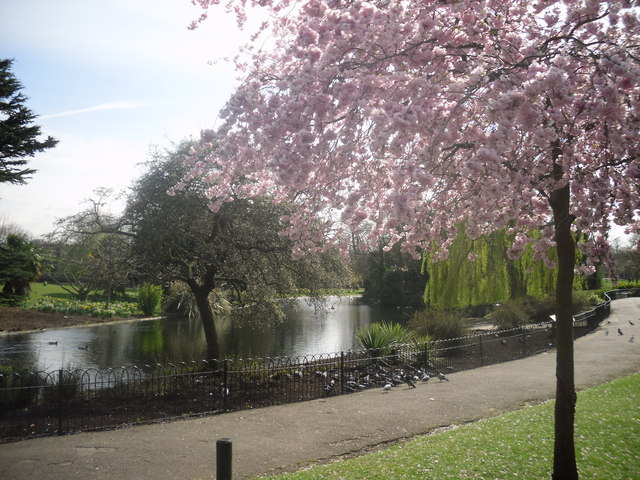
Blossoms in Ravenscourt Park

However, it transpired that the ground-leases of the row of detached and semi-detached residences called Ravenscourt Park, extending southwards from No. 23, contained a proviso giving ground-tenants the right to forbid any building on the width of the park opposite their frontages. The new freeholder promptly took steps to remove this obstacle by buying out the rights of prohibition for small cash sums. Two of the ground-tenants, Ebenezer Stanley Burchett of 23 Ravenscourt Park and Frank Dethbridge of "The Hermitage", determined to block the development by demanding much larger sums of £1000 each. Their action had the desired effect, and other lessees demanded similar sums. A total of at least £10–£12,000 would have been added to the development costs, and this initiative effectively knocked the bottom out of the speculation. The freeholder became amenable to fresh negotiations, and eventually agreed to sell the property for the greatly reduced sum of £58,000. It was acquired by the Metropolitan Board of Works (the Hammersmith Vestry contributing half the purchase-money) on 20 November 1887.

The Board of Works established a public park, laid out by J. J. Sexby, in the 13 hectares (32 acres) of land surrounding the House. It was opened on 19 May 1888.

Management of the park was transferred to the London County Council in 1889, to the Greater London Council in 1965, and finally to the Hammersmith London Borough Council in April 1971. A number of "lodges" (i.e. cottages) on the perimeters of the park were also transferred with the stipulation that they could only be inhabited by Council staff who worked there.

=== 20th century ===
Part of Ravenscourt House was used as a tuberculosis dispensary from 1918.

In 1941 Ravenscourt House was severely damaged by incendiary bombs, during The Blitz, and was later demolished. Today, only the stable block remains, which now houses Ravenscourt Park's cafe, sometimes known as the Ravenscourt Park Tea House.

== Modern era ==
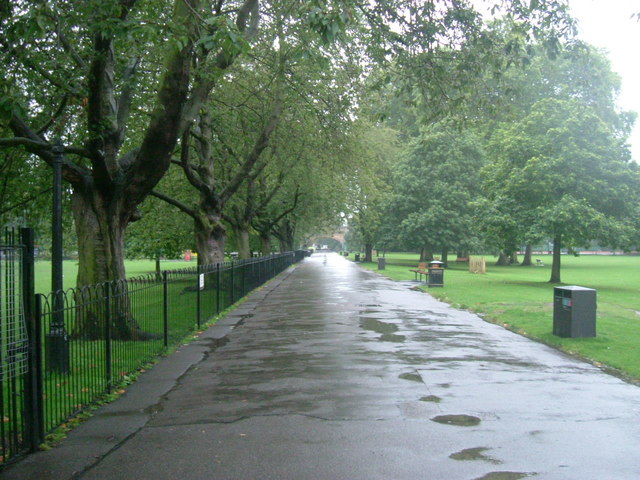
The main avenue in Ravenscourt Park

The park is part of the Conservation Area of Ravenscourt and Starch Green, and its north-eastern corner has been designated an Archaeological Priority Area. Today there is still much evidence of historic planting throughout the park, including plane trees and cedars. The park is home to two Great Trees of London, an old and stunted plane tree, and a large mature tree of heaven.

Ravenscourt Park currently offers many facilities including tennis and basketball courts, a bowling green, an all-weather pitch, a walled garden, multiple play areas, and a paddling pool for children.

There are two cafes in the park. The Tea House is run by Fait Maison and is nearest the Paddenswick Road entrance. W6 Cafe is located within the W6 Garden Centre on Ravenscourt Avenue near King Street.

Friends of Ravenscourt Park is an organisation whose aim is "to maintain and improve a well used and loved park in west London."

A memorial in the park to Giles Hart was unveiled on 5 July 2008. He was a British engineer and trade union activist killed in the 7 July 2005 London bombings.

== In popular culture ==
Filming occurred for the MCU film Spider-Man: Brand New Day in the park during November 2025. Other productions shot in the area include Spare the Rod, Secrets of a Windmill Girl and Victim.

== See also ==
- Hammersmith
- Ravenscourt Park tube station
- Stamford Brook tube station
