= Upminster Depot =

Railway depot in Cranham, London

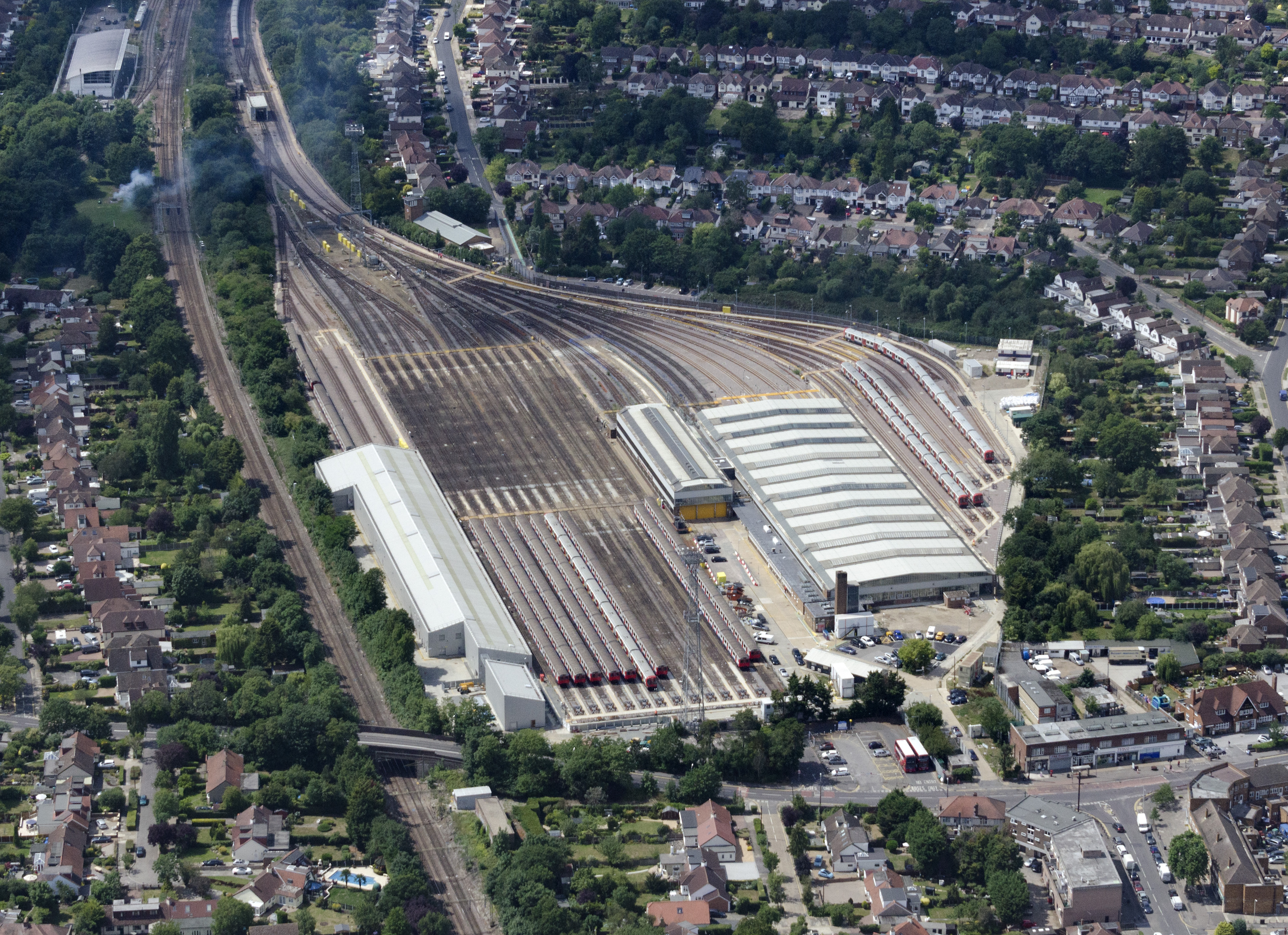
- Aerial view of Upminster Depot in 2015, with D78 and S7 Stock seen stabled
- Interactive map of Upminster Depot

Location
- Location: Cranham, London, England
- Coordinates: 51.5612°N 0.2640°E
- OS grid: TQ572871

Characteristics
- Owner: London Underground
- Type: EMU
- Rolling stock: S7 Stock

History
- Opened: 1959; 67 years ago

Upminster Depot is a London Underground in Cranham in the London Borough of Havering. The depot is located beyond Upminster station, the terminus of the District line.

== History ==
The depot was built in the mid 1950s as part of the segregation of District line tracks from the London, Tilbury and Southend line. District line trains were being stabled at Little Ilford Depot, however this land was required by British Railways. A new depot was therefore built at Upminster, beyond the terminus of the District line station. The depot opened in 1959, the first Underground depot to be built after the Second World War.

== Allocation ==
As of 2016, the depot's allocation consists of London Underground S7 Stock, the only rolling stock used on the District line. Previously the depot was allocated D78 Stock trains.
