= Turnham Green tube station =

London Underground station

Turnham Green
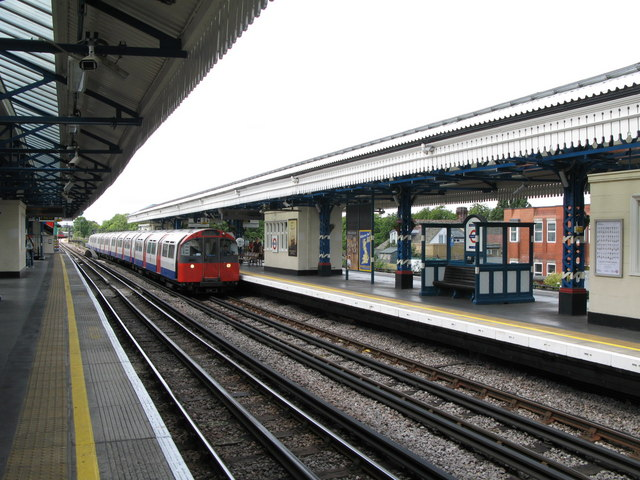
- Piccadilly line tracks at the station
- Interactive map of Turnham Green

General information
- Location: Chiswick
- Local authority: London Borough of Hounslow
- Managed by: London Underground
- Number of platforms: 4
- Fare zone: 2 and 3

London Underground annual entry and exit
- 2020: ▼2.56 million
- 2021: ▲2.66 million
- 2022: ▲4.68 million
- 2023: ▼4.66 million
- 2024: ▲5.03 million

Key dates
- 1 January 1869: Opened (L&SWR)
- 1870: Started and Ended (GWR)
- 1 June 1877: Started (MR and DR)
- 5 May 1878: Started "Super Outer Circle" (Midland)
- 1 July 1879: Opened Ealing Broadway branch (DR)
- 30 September 1880: Ended "Super Outer Circle"
- 1 January 1894: Started (GWR)
- 31 December 1906: Ended (MR)
- 31 December 1910: Ended (GWR)
- 3 June 1916: Ended (L&SWR)
- 23 June 1963: Started (Piccadilly)

Other information
- External links: TfL station info page
- Coordinates: 51.49527°N 0.255°W

Turnham Green (/ˈtɜːrnəm ˈɡriːn/) is a London Underground station in Chiswick of the London Borough of Hounslow in west London. It is served by the District and Piccadilly lines in a manner of cross-platform interchange, although Piccadilly line trains normally stop at the station only at the beginning and end of the day, running through non-stop at other times. To the east, District line trains stop at Stamford Brook and Piccadilly line trains stop at Hammersmith. To the west, District line trains run to either Chiswick Park (towards Ealing Broadway) or Gunnersbury (towards Richmond), and Piccadilly line trains stop at Acton Town. The station is in both London fare zone 2 and 3.

The station is located on Turnham Green Terrace (B491) on the eastern edge of Chiswick Common. It is about 200 m (220 yd) north of Chiswick High Road (A315), and as well as Central Chiswick the station serves the Bedford Park area. The actual Turnham Green park is much closer to Chiswick Park station.

== History ==
The station is located close to the site of the Battle of Turnham Green (1642), during the First English Civil War.

=== District line ===
Turnham Green station was opened on 1 January 1869 by the London and South Western Railway (L&SWR) on a new branch line to Richmond built from the West London Joint Railway starting north of Addison Road station (now Kensington (Olympia)). The line ran through Shepherd's Bush and Hammersmith via a now unused curve and initially the next station towards central London was Grove Road station in Hammersmith (also now closed).

Between 1 June 1870 and 31 October 1870 the Great Western Railway (GWR) briefly ran services from Paddington to Richmond via the Hammersmith & City Railway (now the Hammersmith & City line) tracks to Grove Road then on the L&SWR tracks through Turnham Green.

On 1 June 1877, the District Railway (DR, now the District line) opened a short extension from its terminus at Hammersmith to connect to the L&SWR tracks east of Ravenscourt Park station (which had opened in 1873). The DR then began running trains over the L&SWR tracks to Richmond. On 1 October 1877, the Metropolitan Railway (MR, now the Metropolitan line) restarted the GWR's former service to Richmond via Grove Road station.

On 5 May 1878 [? Other articles say 1 May] the Midland Railway began running a circuitous service known as the Super Outer Circle from St Pancras to Earl's Court via Cricklewood and South Acton. It operated over a now disused connection between the North London Railway and the L&SWR Richmond branch. The service was not a success and was ended on 30 September 1880.

The DR's service between Richmond, Hammersmith and central London was more direct than either the L&SWR's or the MR's routes via Grove Road station or the L&SWR's other route from Richmond via Clapham Junction. The success of the DR's operations led it, on 1 July 1879, to open a branch from Turnham Green to Ealing Broadway.

From 1 January 1894, the GWR began sharing the MR's Richmond service and served Turnham Green once again, meaning that passengers from Turnham Green could travel on the services of four operators.

Following the electrification of the DR's own tracks north of Acton Town in 1903, the DR funded the electrification of the tracks through Turnham Green. The tracks between Acton Town and central London were electrified on 1 July 1905 and those on the Richmond branch on 1 August 1905. Whilst DR services were operated with electric trains, the L&SWR, GWR and MR services continued to be steam hauled.

MR services were withdrawn on 31 December 1906 and GWR services were withdrawn on 31 December 1910 leaving operations at Turnham Green to the DR (by then known as the District Railway) and L&SWR. The L&SWR constructed an additional pair of non-electrified tracks between Turnham Green and its junction with the District at Hammersmith and opened these on 3 December 1911 although their use was short-lived as the District's trains out-competed the L&SWR's to the extent that the L&SWR withdrew its service between Richmond and Addison Road on 3 June 1916, leaving the District as the sole operator.

In 1913, the Central London Railway (now the Central line) obtained parliamentary approval for an extension to Richmond. This would have had a deep-level station at Turnham Green. The stations each side would have been at Heathfield Terrace and Emlyn Road. The plan was delayed by the First World War and an alternative route was adopted in 1920, which was not progressed.

=== Piccadilly line ===
In the early 1930s, the London Electric Railway, precursor of the London Underground and owner of the District and Piccadilly lines, began the reconstruction of the tracks between Hammersmith and Acton Town to enable the Piccadilly line to be extended from Hammersmith to Uxbridge and Hounslow West (then the terminus of what is now the Heathrow branch). Express non-stop tracks were provided for the Piccadilly line between the stopping lines of the District line. Services on the Piccadilly line began running through Turnham Green on 4 July 1932.

To provide a better interchange with the Richmond branch of the District line, Piccadilly line trains began stopping at Turnham Green station in the early mornings (from the first train until 06:50 Monday to Saturday, 07:45 on Sunday) and late evenings (from 22:30 until the last train) only from 23 June 1963. During the rest of the day they run non-stop through the station as before. Local residents have been campaigning for more Piccadilly line trains to stop at Turnham Green with trains only stopping in the event of delays to the District line whereby large numbers of passengers are left waiting on the platform or occasionally while scheduled maintenance work is carried out.

However, in December 2013, it was announced that Turnham Green will be made a permanent stop on the Piccadilly line once the line has been upgraded, with work scheduled to commence in 2019 and introduction of the first new train in 2022. A consultation published in January 2014, concluded that the business case would currently have an overall negative impact on business across London from introducing increased stopping at Turnham Green, but did outline the future plans to do so when upgrades had taken place, with passengers benefiting from improvements to the District line and the Night Tube (on Friday and Saturday nights, beginning with the Jubilee, Victoria, Central, Northern and most of the Piccadilly line, (Note: The Piccadilly line will only operate between Cockfosters and Heathrow Terminals 2, 3 and 5 for Night Tube.) then expanding across other lines in subsequent years) from Autumn 2015 in the interim, giving the following conclusion:

However, we recognise the continued frustration among those who wish for the Piccadilly line to stop for more of the day at Turnham Green station. The signalling constraints and the size of the train fleet mean that we are unlikely to be able to implement changes in the short term. TfL therefore plans to stop Piccadilly line trains at Turnham Green station all day once the line is modernised and we have a new and larger fleet of trains and a new signalling system. This upgrade is set to commence in 2019 with introduction of the first new train in 2022.

In the interim, passengers using Turnham Green station will benefit from the upgrade of the District line. The introduction of a fleet of new larger and walk-through, air-conditioned trains will start this year and be complete by 2016. This will be followed by a new signalling system enabling a faster, more frequent and more reliable service from 2018.

Additionally, the Piccadilly line will stop throughout the night at Turnham Green when the Night Tube network starts in 2015.

However this upgrade was suspended indefinitely due to a lack of funding because of the COVID-19 pandemic.

== The station today ==
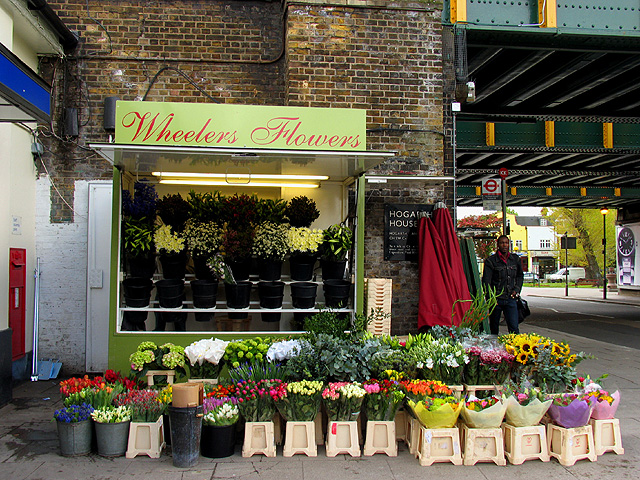
Flower seller outside Turnham Green station.

There is a newsagent near the ticket hall. There are four ticket barriers and a gate that control access to all platforms. Refurbishment work in the station was completed in 2006.

== Services and connections ==
=== Services ===
==== District line ====
Train frequencies vary throughout the day, but generally every 2–8 minutes between 05:16 and 00:15 eastbound, every 6–12 minutes between 06:59 and 01:08 westbound to Ealing Broadway and between 06:28 and 00:37 westbound to Richmond.

==== Piccadilly line ====
During late nights, early mornings and evenings, Piccadilly line trains stop here in order to provide a better interchange with the Richmond branch of the District line. Until 06:50 Mondays to Saturdays and 07:45 on Sundays, and after 22:30, trains stop at this station. Late night trains and Night Tube services also stop at Turnham Green. At all other times (rush hours, middays and weekends), the Piccadilly line does not stop here.

Preceding station	London Underground	Following station
Chiswick Park towards Ealing Broadway	District line	Stamford Brook towards Upminster, High Street Kensington or Edgware Road
Gunnersbury towards Richmond	District line	Stamford Brook towards Upminster, High Street Kensington or Edgware Road
Acton Town towards Uxbridge, Rayners Lane or Heathrow Airport (Terminal 4 or Terminal 5)	Piccadilly line Early morning, late evening and Night Tube service only	Hammersmith towards Cockfosters or Arnos Grove
Former services
Gunnersbury towards Richmond	London and South Western Railway (1869–1916)	Stamford Brook towards West Brompton
Gunnersbury towards Richmond	Metropolitan Railway (1877–1906)	Ravenscourt Park towards Paddington
Gunnersbury towards Richmond	Great Western Railway (1894–1910)	Ravenscourt Park towards Paddington
South Acton towards St Pancras	Midland Railway (1878–1880)	Ravenscourt Park towards Earl's Court
Abandoned plans
Preceding station	London Underground	Following station
Heathfield Terrace towards Richmond	Central line (1913)	Emlyn Road towards Liverpool Street
Gunnersbury towards Richmond	Central line (1920)	Stamford Brook towards Liverpool Street

=== Connections ===
Various day and nighttime London Bus routes serve the station.
