= Hammersmith tube station (District and Piccadilly lines) =

London Underground station

Hammersmith
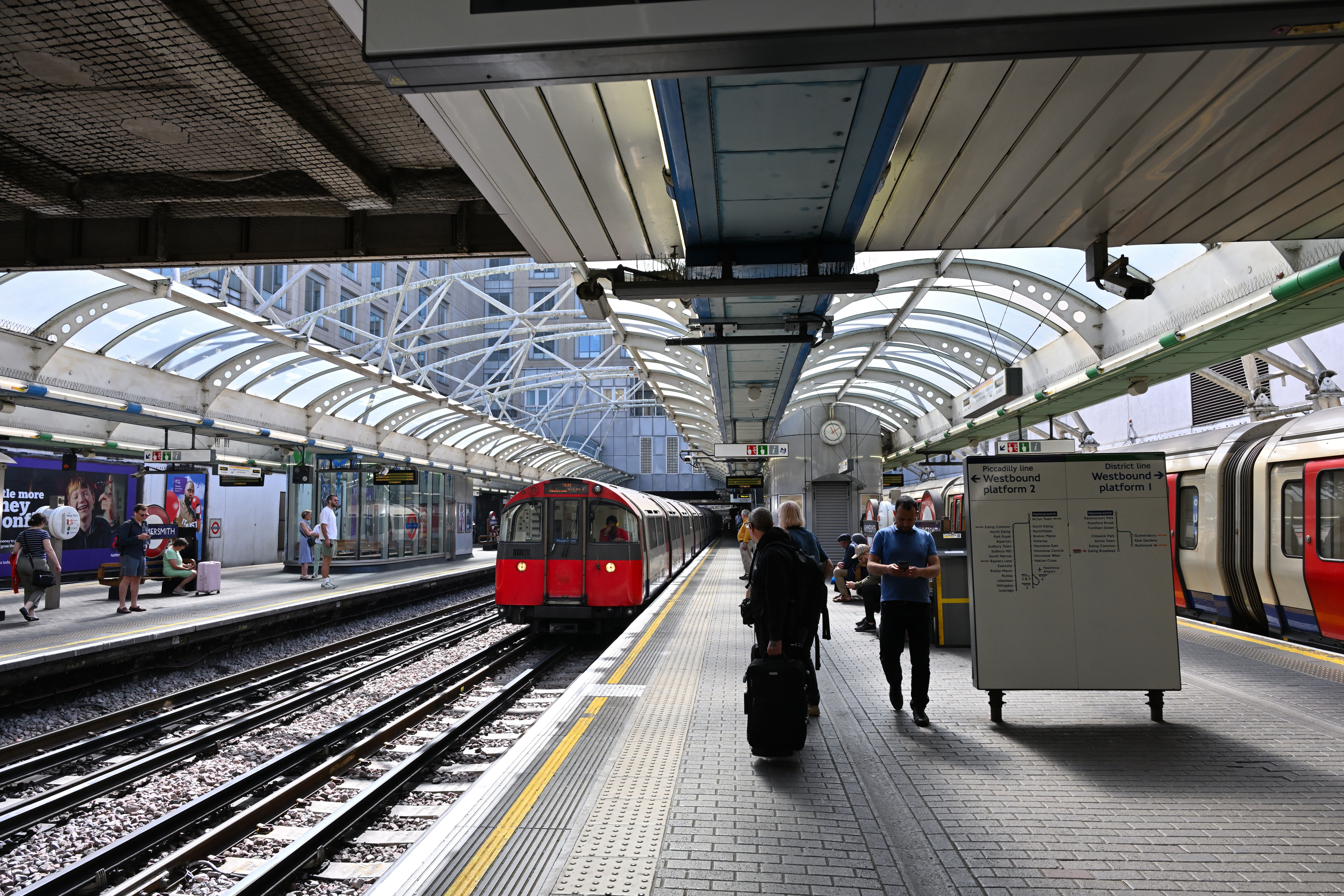
- Piccadilly line westbound platform at the station
- Interactive map of Hammersmith

General information
- Location: Hammersmith, London, England
- Managed by: London Underground
- Number of platforms: 4
- Accessible: Yes
- Fare zone: 2
- OSI: Hammersmith (Circle and Hammersmith & City lines)

London Underground annual entry and exit
- 2021: ▲10.80 million
- 2022: ▲20.06 million
- 2023: ▲20.29 million
- 2024: ▲21.54 million
- 2025: ▲20.68 million

Key dates
- 9 September 1874: Opened (DR)
- 1877: DR extended west
- 5 May 1878: Started "Super Outer Circle" (MR)
- 30 September 1880: Ended "Super Outer Circle"
- 15 December 1906: Started (GNP&BR)(Terminus)
- 4 July 1932: Piccadilly line extended west

Other information
- Coordinates: 51.4927°N 0.2244°W

Hammersmith is a London Underground station in Hammersmith, London. It is served by the District and Piccadilly lines, providing cross-platform interchange between the lines. On the District line, the station is between Ravenscourt Park and Barons Court stations. On the Piccadilly line, it is between Acton Town (or Turnham Green at the very early morning and late evening hours) and Barons Court stations. The station is in London fare zone 2.

The Circle and Hammersmith & City lines' station of the same name is a separate station to the north-west. The two stations are separated by Hammersmith Broadway.

The lifts at this station, which were replaced towards the end of 2013, provide step-free access between the platforms and the main entrance on Hammersmith Broadway.

== History ==
The station was opened on 9 September 1874 by the District Railway (DR, now the District line) as the western terminus of the railway when it was extended from Earl's Court. In 1877, Hammersmith became a through station when the DR was extended west to meet the London and South Western Railway (L&SWR) at Ravenscourt Park and services over the L&SWR tracks started to Richmond.

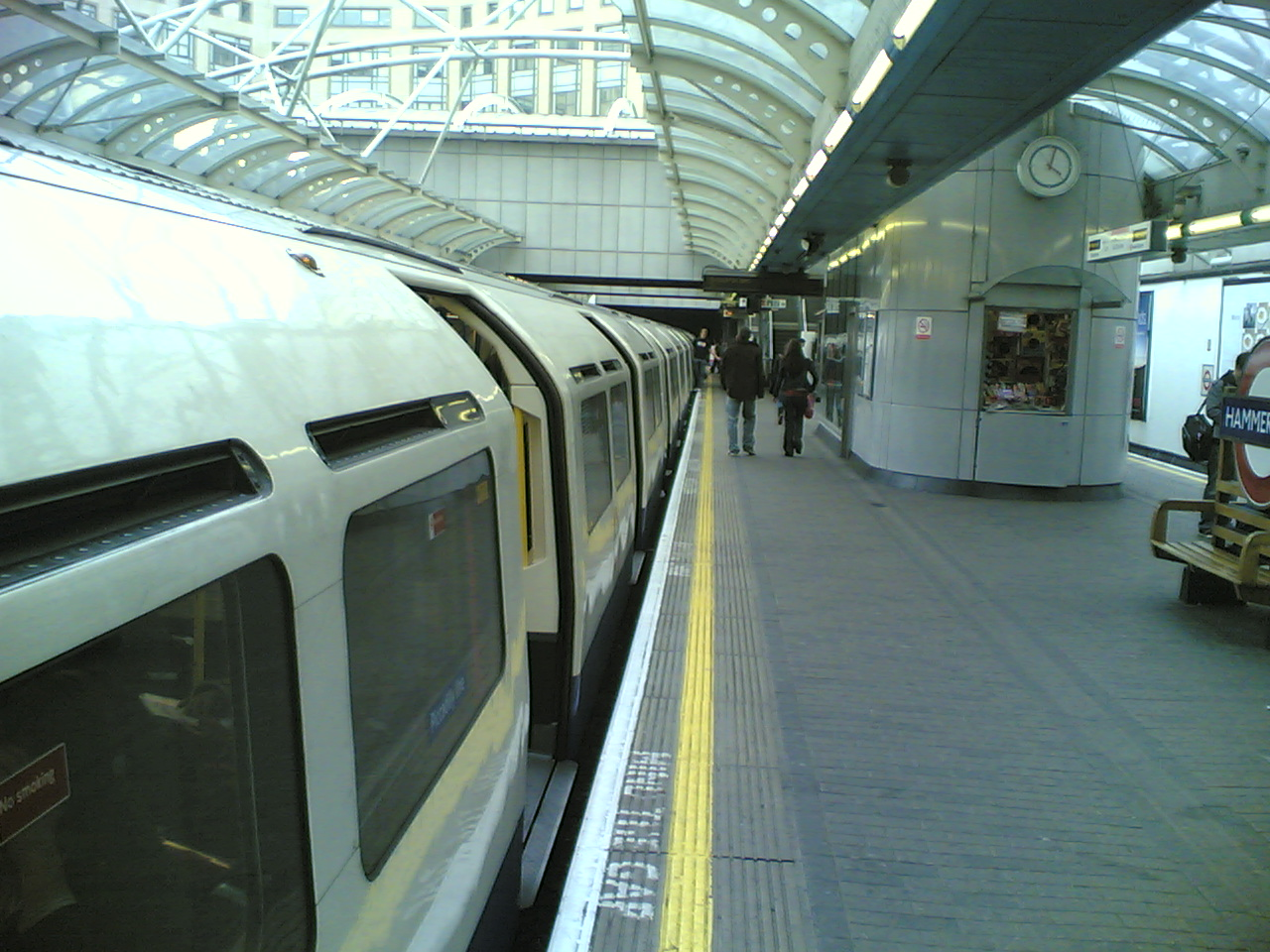
A westbound Piccadilly line train

On 5 May 1878, the Midland Railway began running a circuitous service known as the Super Outer Circle from St Pancras to Earl's Court via Cricklewood and South Acton on the Dudding Hill Line. It operated over a now disused connection between the North London Railway and the L&SWR Richmond branch. The service was not a success and was ended on 30 September 1880.

On 15 December 1906, the Great Northern, Piccadilly and Brompton Railway (GNP&BR, now the Piccadilly line) opened with Hammersmith as its western terminus.

The opening of the western extension of the Piccadilly line from 4 July 1932 required the reconstruction of the station at track level to increase the number of platforms to four and much of the station was rebuilt behind the Harry W Ford designed station building on Hammersmith Broadway. Charles Holden designed a secondary entrance for Queen Caroline Street virtually identical to one he designed at the same time for Highgate (now Archway) station, since demolished.

In the early 1990s, the station buildings were demolished along with the neighbouring bus garage and incorporated into a shopping centre and Underground and bus interchange. During the redevelopment the designers commissioned to undertake the station's re-design, Minale Tattersfield, salvaged parts of the tiling from the Harry W Ford façade showing the station name and the lines serving it and preserved them. They now form a frame to a decorative mosaic of Hammersmith Bridge in the station's north ticket hall.

The station is situated in a cutting below Hammersmith bus station.

=== 2003 derailment ===
On 17 October 2003, a Piccadilly Line train derailed in a tunnel just outside the station, when the wheels of the second-to-last carriage left the tracks. There were no injuries, but there was some damage to rails and sleepers. A report from the subsequent investigation, with input from maintenance contractors Metronet, London Underground, rail unions and rail consultants, determined that the direct cause was a broken rail, and suggested that this resulted from outdated specifications for track inspection, resourcing and equipment.

The rail that snapped was on the outside of a curved section of track. It had been turned around by London Underground in 2001, because of corrosion on its inner face, so that what had been its running side was positioned on the outside of the curve. This meant that what had been the running side – the corroded section – was then put under tension.

The combination of corrosion and the forces exerted on it by trains led to the rail snapping. Ultrasonic inspection equipment specified for track inspections was unable to detect outside face cracks of the type thought to have led to the break. Metronet indicated that it would respond to the incident by using different ultrasound detection equipment, increasing the frequency of track inspections, and preferentially replacing rails rather than turning them around.

== Services ==
Hammersmith station is on the District and Piccadilly lines in London fare zone 2. On the District line, the station is between Ravenscourt Park to the west and Barons Court to the east. On the Piccadilly line, it is between Acton Town (or Turnham Green during the early mornings and late evenings) to the west and Barons Court to the east.

Preceding station	London Underground	Following station
Ravenscourt Park towards Ealing Broadway or Richmond	District line	Barons Court towards Upminster, High Street Kensington or Edgware Road
Acton Town towards Uxbridge, Rayners Lane or Heathrow Airport (Terminal 4 or Terminal 5)	Piccadilly line	Barons Court towards Cockfosters or Arnos Grove
Turnham Green towards Uxbridge, Rayners Lane or Heathrow Airport (Terminal 4 or Terminal 5)	Piccadilly line Early morning, late evening and Night Tube service only	Barons Court towards Cockfosters or Arnos Grove
Former service
Ravenscourt Park towards St Pancras	Midland Railway (1878–1880)	West Kensington towards Earl's Court

== Connections ==
London Buses day and night serve the station from Hammersmith bus station, part of which is above Hammersmith Broadway.

== See also ==
- Hammersmith tube station (Circle and Hammersmith & City lines), a different station of the same name as this station but is the western terminus of the Circle and Hammersmith & City lines.
- Hammersmith (Grove Road) station, a third station that used to exist adjacent to the Hammersmith and City Line station on the L&SWR line through Shepherd's Bush to the West London Line.
