= District line =

London Underground line

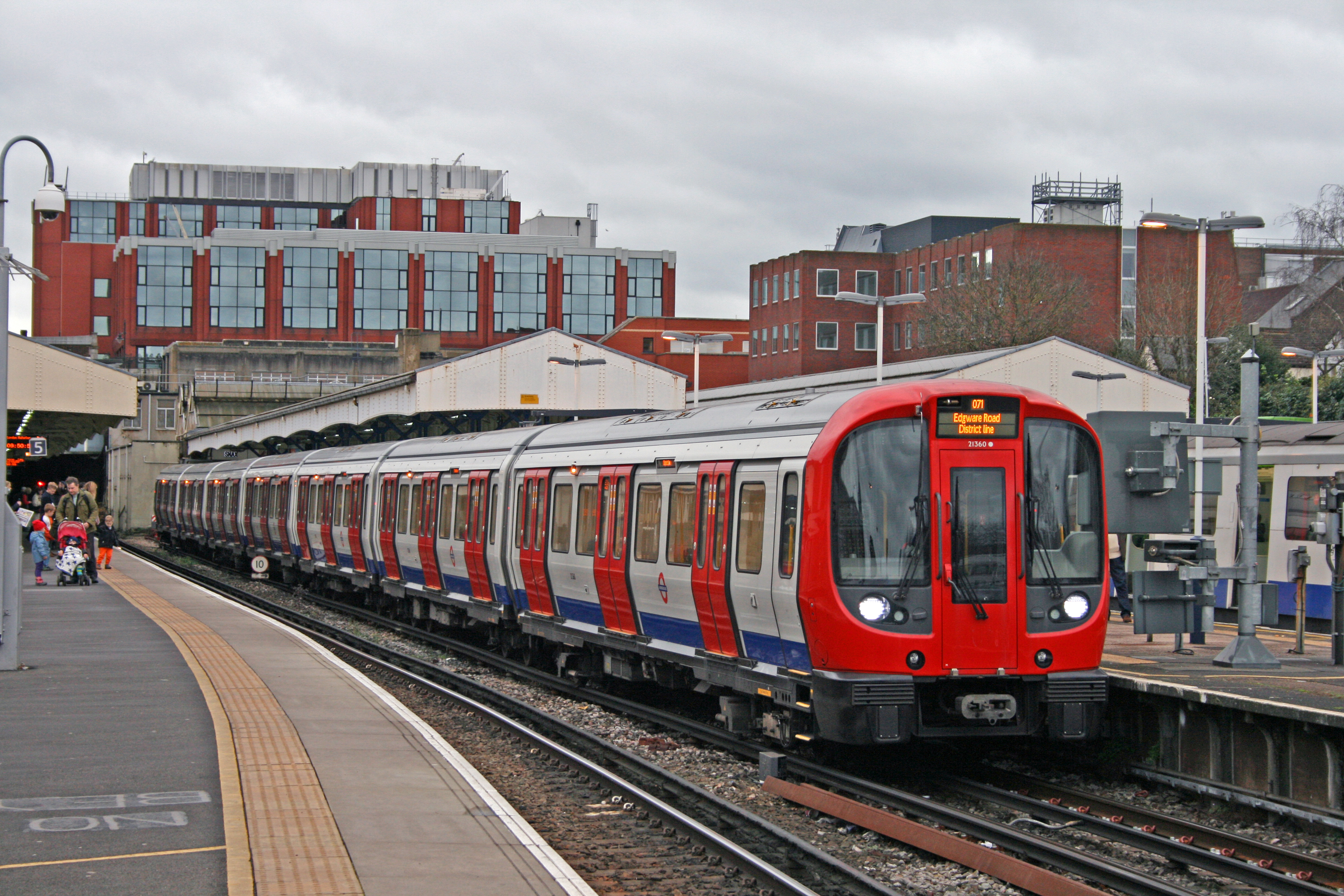
- A District line train at Wimbledon bound for Edgware Road, 2014

Overview
- Termini: Edgware Road; Upminster; Richmond; Ealing Broadway; Wimbledon; Kensington (Olympia)
- Stations: 60
- Colour on map: Green
- Website: tfl.gov.uk/tube/route/district/

Service
- Type: Rapid transit
- System: London Underground
- Depots: Upminster; Ealing Common; Lillie Bridge
- Rolling stock: S7 Stock
- Ridership: 251.199 million (2019) passenger journeys

History
- Opened: 24 December 1868; 157 years ago (as the Metropolitan District Railway)

Technical
- Line length: 64 km (40 mi)
- Character: Sub-surface
- Track gauge: 1,435 mm (4 ft 8 1/2 in) standard gauge
- Electrification: 750 V DC; 630 V DC on sections shared with the Piccadilly line
- Operating speed: 62 mph (100 km/h)
- Signalling: CBTC (east of Barons Court and Fulham Broadway); Train stop (west of Barons Court and Fulham Broadway)
Transport for London rail lines
London Underground
Bakerloo
Central
Circle
District
Hammersmith & City
Jubilee
Metropolitan
Northern
Piccadilly
Victoria
Waterloo & City
London Overground
Liberty
Lioness
Mildmay
Suffragette
Weaver
Windrush
Other TfL Modes
DLR
Elizabeth line
London Trams

The District line is a London Underground line running from Upminster in the east and Edgware Road in northwestern Central London to Earl's Court in west London, where it splits into multiple branches. One branch runs to Wimbledon in south-west London and a short branch, with a limited service, only runs for one stop to Kensington (Olympia). The main route continues west from Earl's Court to Turnham Green after which it divides again into two western branches, to Richmond and Ealing Broadway.

Printed in green on the Tube map, the line serves 60 stations (more than any other Underground line) over 40 miles (64 km). It is the only Underground line to use a bridge to traverse the River Thames, crossing on both the Wimbledon and Richmond branches. The track and stations between Barking and Aldgate East are shared with the Hammersmith & City line, and between Tower Hill and Gloucester Road and on the Edgware Road branch they are shared with the Circle line. Some of the stations between South Kensington and Ealing Common are shared with the Piccadilly line. Unlike London's deep-level lines, the railway tunnels are just below the surface, and the trains are of a similar size to those on British main lines.

The District line is the busiest of the sub-surface lines and the fifth-busiest line overall on the Underground with over 250 million passenger journeys recorded in 2019.

The original Metropolitan District Railway (as it was then called) opened in December 1868 from South Kensington to Westminster as part of a plan for a below-ground "inner circle" connecting London's main line termini. At first, services were operated using wooden carriages hauled by steam locomotives. Electrification was financed by the American Charles Yerkes, and electric services began in 1905. The railway was absorbed by the London Passenger Transport Board in 1933. In the first half of the 1930s, the Piccadilly line took over the Uxbridge and Hounslow branches, although a peak-hour District line service ran on the Hounslow branch until 1964. Kensington Olympia has been served by the District line since 1946, and a short branch to South Acton closed in 1959. The trains carried guards until one-person operation was introduced in 1985.

The signalling system is being upgraded (as part of the Four Lines Modernisation project) as of September 2019 and the previous D Stock trains were fully replaced by seven-car S Stock trains in April 2017.

== History ==
=== District Railway ===
The Metropolitan District Railway (commonly known as the District Railway) was formed to build and operate part of an underground 'inner circle' connecting London's railway termini. The first line opened in December 1868, with services from South Kensington to Westminster; these were operated by the Metropolitan Railway using wooden carriages hauled by steam locomotives. By 1871, when the District began operating its own trains, the railway had extended to West Brompton and a terminus at Mansion House. A curve from Earl's Court onto the West London Railway was used by the London & North Western Railway (L&NWR) for a service to Broad Street and the Great Western Railway for a service to Moorgate via Paddington. Between 1 March 1883 and 30 September 1885, the District Railway ran trains between Mansion House and Windsor, via Paddington. Stations after Ealing Broadway (the current terminus) were West Ealing, Hanwell, Southall, Hayes & Harlington, West Drayton, Langley, Slough, and Windsor. The service was discontinued because it was uneconomic.

Hammersmith was reached from Earl's Court, services were extended to Richmond over the tracks of the London and South Western Railway (L&SWR), and branches reached Ealing Broadway, Hounslow and Wimbledon. As part of the project that completed the Circle line in October 1884, the District began to serve Whitechapel. Services began running to Upminster in 1902, after a link to the London, Tilbury & Southend Railway (LT&SR) had been built.

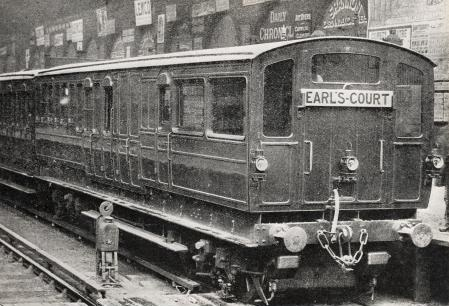
The jointly owned experimental passenger train that ran for six months in 1900

At the start of the 20th century, the District was seeing increased competition from the new electric underground tube lines and trams, and the use of steam locomotives underground led to unpopular smoke-filled stations and carriages. The American Charles Yerkes, who was later to form the Underground Electric Railways of London, financed the necessary electrification of the railway, and the first electric services ran from Ealing to South Harrow in 1903. Electric multiple-units were introduced on other services in 1905, and East Ham became the eastern terminus. Electric locomotives were used on the L&NWR services from Mansion House to Earl's Court, and in later years exchanged for a steam locomotive on LT&SR services from Southend to Ealing Broadway at Barking.

Hounslow and Uxbridge were served by 2 or 3-car shuttles from Mill Hill Park (now Acton Town); some trains also served South Acton and central London in the peaks. Services were extended again to Barking in 1908 and Upminster in 1932. In 1932 Piccadilly line trains were extended from Hammersmith to South Harrow, taking over the District service from Acton Town to South Harrow, although the District continued to provide a shuttle from South Harrow to Uxbridge. In 1933, Piccadilly line trains reached Hounslow West, the District continuing to run services with an off-peak shuttle from South Acton to Hounslow.

=== London Transport ===
On 1 July 1933, the District Railway amalgamated with other Underground railways, tramway companies and bus operators to form the London Passenger Transport Board, and from 23 October 1933 Piccadilly line trains ran through to Uxbridge and the District line shuttle was withdrawn. Most of the trailer cars on the District line were the 1904–1905 B Stock type with wooden bodies, but motor cars were less than fifteen years old. The 1935–1940 New Works Programme saw the Q Stock formed from these motor cars, upgraded with electro-pneumatic brakes and guard controlled air-operated doors, and the trailers replaced with new vehicles. The off-peak District line services on the Hounslow branch were withdrawn on 29 April 1935 and South Acton served by a shuttle to Acton Town.

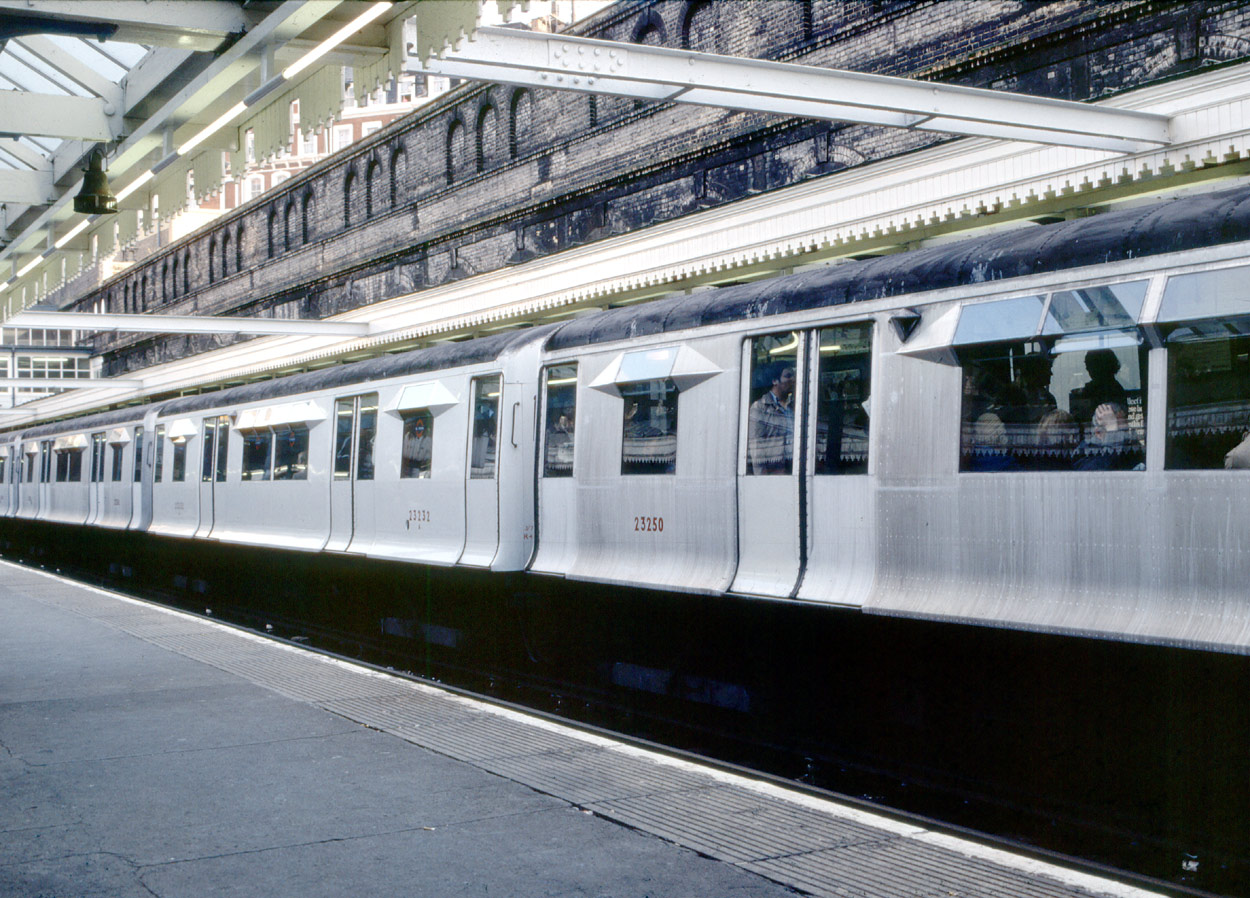
An R Stock train composed of a mixture of unpainted aluminium and (white) painted steel cars

The London, Midland and Scottish Railway (LMS) had taken over the L&NWR railway's service from Earl's Court and by the Second World War this had been cut back to an electric Earl's Court to Willesden Junction shuttle. Following bombing of the West London Line in 1940, the LMS and the Metropolitan line services over the West London Line were both suspended. This left the Olympia exhibition centre without a railway service, so after the war the Kensington Addison Road station was renamed Kensington (Olympia) and served by a District line shuttle from Earl's Court. R Stock, composed of new cars and the Q Stock trailers that had been built in 1938, replaced the trains with hand-operated sliding doors that remained. The new trains were built between 1949 and 1959, and after 1952 trains were constructed from aluminium, saving weight. One train was left unpainted as an experiment and considered a success, so between 1963 and 1968 trains were left unpainted or painted white or grey to match. The transfer of CO/CP Stock from the Metropolitan line in the early 1960s allowed some of the Q stock to be scrapped. The slow tracks on the former LT&SR line to Upminster were shared with steam locomotive hauled goods and passenger services, until 1961 when the District took over exclusive use of the DC electrified lines.

The South Acton shuttle was withdrawn on 28 February 1959, followed by the peak hour District line through service to Hounslow on 9 October 1964. The whole District line service could not run through Aldgate East as this station was also served by Hammersmith & City trains, so some trains terminated at a bay platform at Mansion House, leaving the line east to Tower Hill overcrowded. Tower Hill station was also cramped, so the station was rebuilt with three platforms on a new site. This opened in 1967 and a year later trains reversed at the new station.

Services were operated with 6 cars off-peak and 8 cars during peak hours until 1971, when trains were reformed as fixed 7-car trains, and some 6-car trains for the Edgware Road branch. The CO/CP and R Stock were replaced in the late 1970s by new trains with unpainted aluminium bodies. A shorter train was needed on the Edgware Road branch due to the platform lengths so more of the C stock units, then already in use on the Circle and Hammersmith and City lines, were built. The rest of the District line could use longer trains and new D Stock trains were introduced between 1979 and 1983. Driver-only operation of the trains was proposed in 1972, but due to conflict with the trade unions was not introduced on the District line until 1985. In 2003, the infrastructure of the District line was partly privatised in a public–private partnership, managed by the Metronet consortium. Metronet went into administration in 2007 and the local government body Transport for London took over responsibilities.

== Route ==
=== Map ===
The route of the District line

=== Railway line ===
The District line is 40 miles (64 km) long and serves 60 stations. The line is electrified with a four-rail DC system: from Upminster to Putney Bridge, Olympia, Barons Court, and Edgware Road a central conductor rail is now energised at −250 volts and a rail outside the running rail at +500 V, giving a potential difference of 750 V. The section from Barons Court to Ealing Broadway remains at −210 V with a rail outside the running rail at +420 V, giving a potential difference of 630 V. The two sections over which main line trains run, from East Putney to Wimbledon, and from Gunnersbury to Richmond, have the centre rail bonded to the running rails. West of Earl's Court, there are four branches. At Ealing Broadway station, the District line has platforms north of the Central line and the Great Western Main Line out of Paddington. After about 2/3 mile (1.1 km), the line meets the Piccadilly line Uxbridge branch at Hanger Lane junction, and the tracks are then shared through Ealing Common station until Acton Town station, where the Piccadilly line Heathrow branch joins. From Acton Town to Barons Court, the line has four tracks, paired by use: the District line uses the outer pair and the non-stopping Piccadilly line trains use the inner pair. At Richmond station, the Mildmay line and District line platforms are north of the Waterloo to Reading line through platforms. The two tracks which cross the Thames at Kew Railway Bridge are shared with the Mildmay line trains until Gunnersbury junction, after which the District line tracks join the four-track District and Piccadilly lines just before Turnham Green station.

On the main line, there are cross-platform interchanges at Acton Town, Hammersmith and Barons Court stations, after which the Piccadilly line tracks descend into tunnels, while the District line becomes two tracks through West Kensington station. Before the line enters Earl's Court station, the short Kensington (Olympia) branch joins at a flat junction and the Wimbledon branch at a grade-separated junction. On the Wimbledon branch, the District line at Wimbledon station is west of the South West Main Line platforms, then the two-track line has a junction at East Putney station with the Waterloo to Reading line, before passing over the River Thames on Fulham Railway Bridge; the line continues by passing under the West London Railway and coming alongside it at West Brompton station before the junction with the main line and the four-platform Earl's Court station.

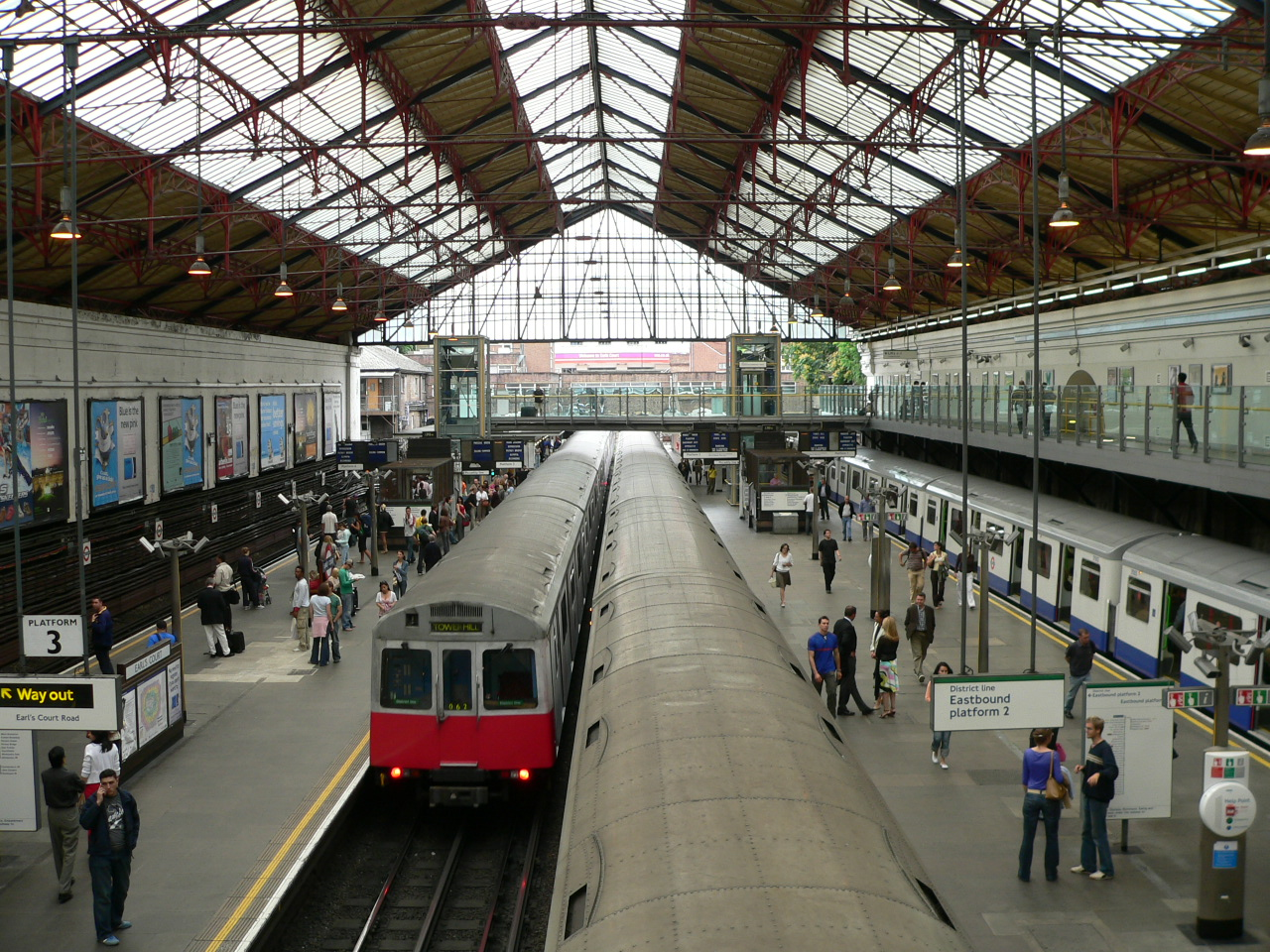
Overhead view of the District line platforms at Earl's Court, 2005

East of Earl's Court there is a grade-separated junction off the main line to the Edgware Road branch. This follows the Circle line after High Street Kensington station where there are also two bay platforms for the District line. After Paddington station this branch joins the Hammersmith & City line at Praed Street junction, before terminating at the four-platform Edgware Road. The main line joins the Circle line at Gloucester Road and the line and stations are in cut-and-cover tunnels, meeting the Thames at Westminster station, after which the railway is in the Victoria Embankment on the north bank of the river. At Tower Hill station, there is a bay platform.

After Tower Hill, the Circle line diverges, the District line joining the Hammersmith & City line just before Aldgate East station. The line passes over the Windrush line at Whitechapel station before continuing on the 2-mile (3.2 km) Whitechapel and Bow Railway to Bow Road, where the line surfaces, and Bromley-by-Bow, where the line runs alongside the London, Tilbury and Southend line from Fenchurch Street station. There is an interchange with this line at the next station, West Ham, as well as with the Jubilee line and the Docklands Light Railway. There is a bay platform at the next station, Plaistow, and the Hammersmith & City line terminates at Barking station. The District line follows the London, Tilbury and Southend Railway for another eight stations, before terminating at Upminster station.

The line mainly runs in cut and cover tunnels between West Kensington and Bow Road, including the Edgware Road branch. However, due to the nature of sub-surface lines, the cutting is occasionally left open both at and between stations for ventilation. West of Earl's Court, the line is entirely surface level, with the exception of the Hammersmith and Fulham Broadway stations, which are in cuttings built over by recent developments. There is also a small section of tunnel between Southfields and East Putney.

== Services ==
The off-peak service since 13 January 2025 in trains per hour (tph) is:

- 6 tph (trains per hour) Ealing Broadway to Upminster
- 6 tph Richmond to Upminster
- 3 tph Wimbledon to Tower Hill
- 3 tph Wimbledon to Barking
- 6 tph Wimbledon to Edgware Road

This gives a service of 18 trains per hour (a train every 3–4 minutes) between Earl's Court and Tower Hill. Together with the Circle line, there are 24 trains per hour (a train every 2.5 minutes) between Gloucester Road and Tower Hill, and together with the Hammersmith & City line, there are 21 trains per hour between Aldgate East and Barking. As of 2026, the short branch to Kensington (Olympia) is only served by three trains per hour at weekends and on weekdays during major events.

In 2011/12, 208 million passenger journeys were made on the District line

There are additional trains during peak hours. The central section from Earl's Court to Aldgate East is in London fare zone 1 and to the west Ealing Broadway and Wimbledon are in zone 3 and Richmond in zone 4. To the east the line runs to Upminster in zone 6.

== Rolling stock ==
=== S Stock ===
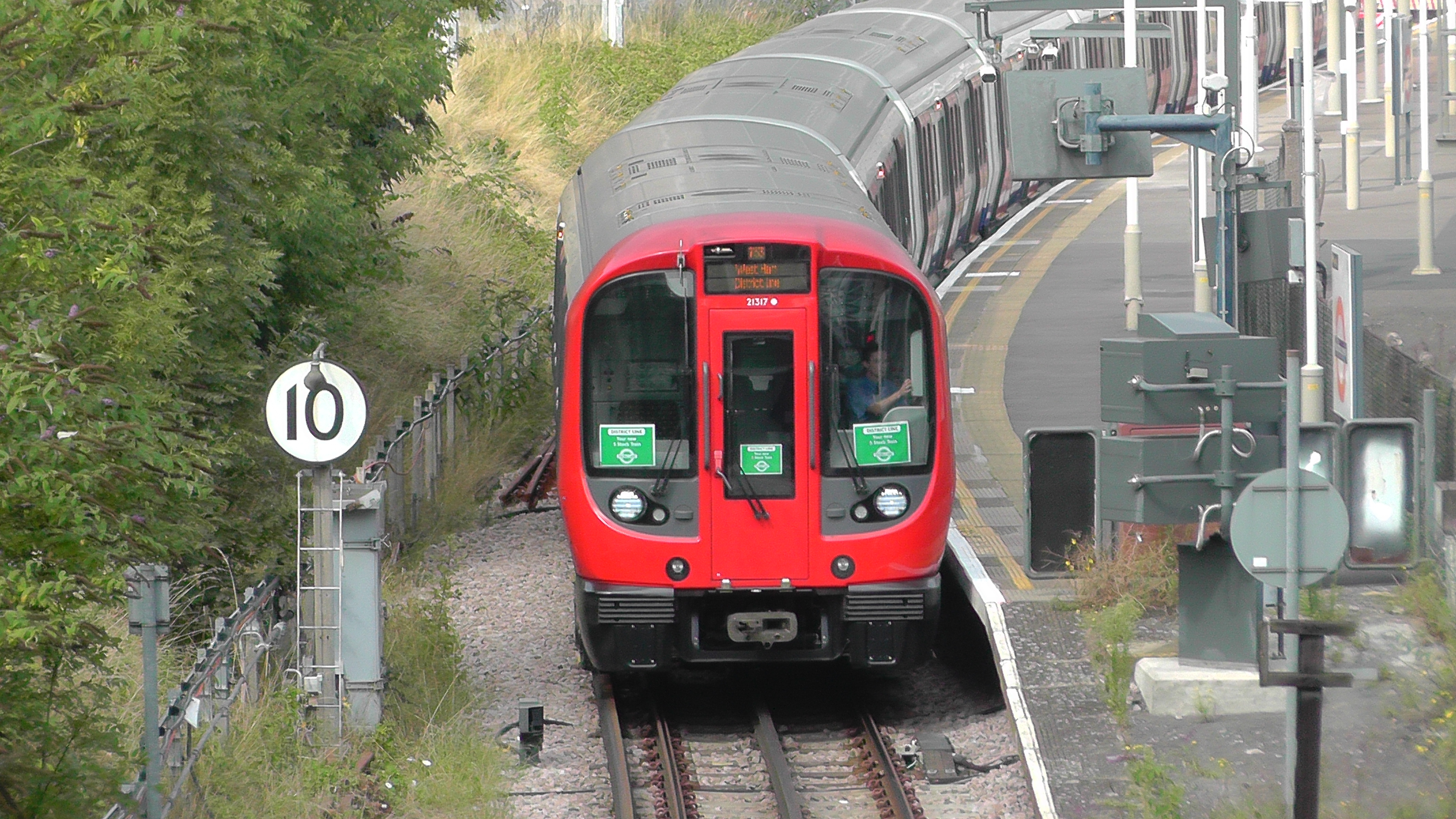
District line S7 S Stock train at Kensington (Olympia) station, 2013

The current 7-car S Stock trains began to enter service on the line in 2013, beginning with services between Olympia and West Ham, gradually replacing the C and D Stock. Like the 8-car variants now in use on the Metropolitan line, these trains are part of Bombardier's Movia family, with air-conditioning, as the sub-surface tunnels (unlike those on the deep-level tube lines) are able to disperse the exhausted hot air.

With a top speed of 62 mph (100 km/h), a 7-car S Stock train has a capacity of 865 passengers compared to 739 for a 6-car C Stock train and 827 for a 6-car D Stock train. With a length of 117 metres (384 ft), the S Stock trains are 24 metres (79 ft) longer than the 93-metre (305 ft) long C stock trains, and station platforms have been lengthened. The trains have regenerative brakes, allowing them to return around 20 per cent of their energy to the network. Traction voltage was increased in 2017 from nominal 630 V to 750 V to give better performance and allow the trains to return more energy to the network through their regenerative brakes.

=== Depots ===
The S Stock trains are maintained at Ealing Common Depot (Note: Location of Ealing Common Depot: 51°30′24″N 000°17′07″W) and Upminster Depot. (Note: Location of Upminster Depot: 51°33′38″N 000°15′52″E) Ealing Common Depot was built by the District Railway when it was electrified in the early 1900s. Upminster depot was built 1956–1958 when the District line tracks were segregated. Trains may also be stabled in the sidings east of Barking alongside Hammersmith & City Line trains.

== Four Lines Modernisation (4LM) ==
It was planned that a new signalling system would be used first on the sub-surface lines from the end of 2016, but signalling contractor Bombardier was released from its contract by agreement in December 2013 amid heavy criticism of the procurement process and London Underground subsequently awarded the contract for the project to Thales in August 2015.

With the introduction of S7 Stock, the track, electrical supply, and signalling systems are being upgraded in a programme planned to increase peak-hour capacity on the line by 27 per cent by the end of 2023. A single control room for the sub-surface railway opened at Hammersmith on 6 May 2018, and Communications Based Train Control (CBTC) provided by Thales will progressively replace 'fixed block' signalling equipment dating back to the 1940s.

The rollout of CBTC has been split into sections, each known as a Signal Migration Area (SMA), and are located on the line as follows:

District line Signal Migration Areas
| SMA (Note: SMAs 0.5, 1, 8–9 and 13–14 concerns parts of the Circle, Hammersmith & City, and Metropolitan lines.) | from | to | status | date |
|---|---|---|---|---|
| 2 | Paddington | Edgware Road | commissioned | September 2019 |
| 3 | Monument | Stepney Green | completed | July 2020 |
| 4 | Monument | Sloane Square | completed | August 2020 |
| 5 | Sloane Square | Olympia; Barons Court; Fulham Broadway; Paddington (Note: SMA 5 from Sloane Square to Paddington includes the District line from Sloane Square to Earl's Court, and from Earl's Court to Paddington.) | completed | March 2022 |
| 6 | Stepney Green | Becontree | completed | January 2023 |
| 7 | Becontree | Upminster | completed | March 2023 |
| 10 | Barons Court | Stamford Brook | planned | June 2026 |
| 11 | Stamford Brook | Richmond | deferred | until further notice |
| 12 | Fulham Broadway | East Putney | planned | June 2026 |

== List of stations ==
=== Open stations ===
In order from west to east

| Station | Image | Opened | Branch | Additional information | Position |
|---|---|---|---|---|---|
| Richmond | | 1 October 1877 | Richmond | Connects with National Rail services. Opened by the L&SWR as Richmond New on 1 January 1869 and this amalgamated with the main line station in 1937. | 51°27′47″N 000°18′00″W |
| Kew Gardens | | 1 October 1877 | Richmond | L&SWR station opened 1 January 1869 | 51°28′38″N 000°17′07″W |
| Gunnersbury | | 1 October 1877 | Richmond | Connects with Mildmay line services. Opened by L&SWR as Brentford Road 1 January 1869, renamed 1871. | 51°29′30″N 000°16′30″W |
| Ealing Broadway | | 1 July 1879 | Ealing; Broadway | Connects with Central line, Elizabeth line and National Rail services. | 51°30′53″N 000°18′06″W |
| Ealing Common | | 1 July 1879 | Ealing; Broadway | Connects with Piccadilly line. Between 1886 and 1910 known as Ealing Common and West Acton | 51°30′37″N 000°17′17″W |
| Acton Town | | 1 July 1879 | Ealing; Broadway | Connects with Piccadilly line. Opened as Mill Hill Park, renamed 1 March 1910. Connects with Piccadilly line | 51°30′10″N 000°16′48″W |
| Chiswick Park | | 1 July 1879 | Ealing; Broadway | Opened as Acton Green, renamed Chiswick Park and Acton Green in 1889, renamed 1910 | 51°29′41″N 000°16′04″W |
| Turnham Green | | 1 June 1877 | Main line | L&SWR station opened 1 January 1869 | 51°29′43″N 000°15′18″W |
| Stamford Brook | | 1 February 1912 | Main line | | 51°29′42″N 000°14′45″W |
| Ravenscourt Park | | 1 June 1877 | Main line | Opened as Shaftesbury Road by L&SWR on 1 April 1873, renamed 1 March 1888 | 51°29′39″N 000°14′09″W |
| Hammersmith | | 9 September 1874 | Main line | Connects with Piccadilly, Hammersmith & City and Circle lines | 51°29′39″N 000°13′30″W |
| Barons Court | | 15 December 1906 | Main line | Connects with Piccadilly line | 51°29′26″N 000°12′49″W |
| West Kensington | | 9 September 1874 | Main line | Opened as North End (Fulham), renamed 1877 | 51°29′27″N 000°12′23″W |
| Wimbledon | | 3 June 1889 | Wimbledon | Connects with National Rail and Tramlink services. L&SWR station opened 21 May 1838. | 51°25′24″N 000°12′15″W |
| Wimbledon Park | | 3 June 1889 | Wimbledon | | 51°26′02″N 000°12′00″W |
| Southfields | | 3 June 1889 | Wimbledon | | 51°26′42″N 000°12′25″W |
| East Putney | | 3 June 1889 | Wimbledon | | 51°27′31″N 000°12′41″W |
| Putney Bridge | | 1 March 1880 | Wimbledon | Opened as Putney Bridge & Fulham, renamed 1 January 1902 as Putney Bridge & Hurlingham, current name from 1932 | 51°28′06″N 000°12′32″W |
| Parsons Green | | 1 March 1880 | Wimbledon | | 51°28′31″N 000°12′04″W |
| Fulham Broadway | | 1 March 1880 | Wimbledon | Opened as Walham Green, renamed 2 March 1952 | 51°28′50″N 000°11′41″W |
| West Brompton | | 12 April 1869 | Wimbledon | Connects with National Rail and Mildmay line services. | 51°29′12″N 000°11′45″W |
| Kensington (Olympia) | | 20 December 1946 | Olympia | Connects with National Rail and Mildmay line services. The L&SWR opened a Kensington station on the West London Railway briefly in 1844. This station was opened on 2 June 1862 and was renamed Kensington Addison Road in 1868 and served by L&NWR, GWR, Metropolitan and other railways until services were withdrawn in 1940. Reopened as a branch of the District line in 1946. | 51°29′55″N 000°12′39″W |
| Earl's Court | | 30 October 1871 | Main line | Connects with Piccadilly line and all other District line services. | 51°29′29″N 000°11′41″W |
| High Street Kensington | A white many-windowed building | 1 October 1868 | Edgware Road | Opened as Kensington (High Street) and name gradually changed by 1880. Connects with the Circle line. | 51°30′03″N 000°11′33″W |
| Notting Hill Gate | A railway station with side platforms either side of two tracks that disappear into darkness under a painted steel bridge like structure topped with a brick wall, covered by a partially glazed barrel roof. | 1 October 1868 | Edgware Road | Connects with Central line. | 51°30′32″N 000°11′49″W |
| Bayswater | A single storey pale brick building topped with stone railing. Above an entrance is a canopy, around which are rectanglar blue signs reading "BAYSWATER" and "BAYSWATER STATION". People are walking in the street. | 1 October 1868 | Edgware Road | Opened as Bayswater, renamed Bayswater (Queen's Road) & Westbourne Grove in 1923, Bayswater (Queen's Road) in 1933 and Bayswater (Queensway) in 1946, after which the suffix was gradually dropped. | 51°30′43″N 000°11′17″W |
| Paddington | A pale two-storey stone building, with gold coloured letters at the top reading "METROPOLITAN RAILWAY" and "PADDINGTON STATION", windows on the first floor. On the ground floor there are shops either side of an entrance with a canopy with rectangular blue signs reading "PADDINGTON STATION". There are cars and a small truck in the road and people are walking on the pavement. | 1 October 1868 | Edgware Road | Opened as Paddington (Praed Street), renamed in 1948. Connects with Bakerloo line, Circle and Hammersmith & City lines to Hammersmith, Elizabeth line, and Paddington main line station. | 51°30′56″N 000°10′32″W |
| Edgware Road | | 1 October 1863 | Edgware Road | Connects with Circle and Hammersmith & City lines. | 51°31′12″N 000°10′04″W |
| Gloucester Road | A beige-bricked building with a green sign reading "METROPOLITAN & DISTRICT RAILWAYS GLOUCESTER ROAD STATION" in white letters | 1 October 1868 | Main line | Opened as Brompton (Gloucester Road), renamed in 1907. Connects with Piccadilly and Circle lines. | 51°29′41″N 000°10′59″W |
| South Kensington | A entrance behind a raised bed of green plant and under a blue sign reading "SOUTH KENSINGTON STATION" leads into an arcade of shops. Above the entrance there is a glass panel with white lettering reading "METROPOLITAN AND DISTRICT RAILWAYS" and "SOUTH KENSINGTON STATION". | 24 December 1868 | Main line | Connects with Piccadilly line | 51°29′39″N 000°10′26″W |
| Sloane Square | A modern looking building with marble coloured tiled wall at ground level with grey cladding above. A small concrete canopy is over the larger of two entrances with blue signs reading "SLOANE SQUARE STATION", people are entering and exiting through the larger entrance. | 24 December 1868 | Main line | | 51°29′33″N 000°09′24″W |
| Victoria | A grey building with three rectangular, white signs reading "London Victoria Station" in black letters all under a clear, white sky | 24 December 1868 | Main line | Connects with Victoria line and National Rail services. | 51°29′48″N 000°08′41″W |
| St James's Park | | 24 December 1868 | Main line | | 51°29′58″N 000°08′04″W |
| Westminster | A large crowd of people walking on a grey sidewalk next to a black road where two vehicles are driving from the left to the right | 24 December 1868 | Main line | Opened as Westminster Bridge, renamed in 1907. Connects with Jubilee line. | 51°30′04″N 000°07′30″W |
| Embankment | A grey building with a blue sign reading "EMBANKMENT STATION" in white letters and people standing in the foreground all under a white sky | 30 May 1870 | Main line | Opened as Charing Cross, renamed Charing Cross Embankment in 1974 and to the current name from 1976. Connects with Bakerloo and Northern lines and Charing Cross National Rail station. | 51°30′25″N 000°07′19″W |
| Temple | A grey building with a rectangular, white sign on a rounded corner reading "TEMPLE STATION" in black letters all under a blue sky | 30 May 1870 | Main line | Opened as The Temple. | 51°30′40″N 000°06′52″W |
| Blackfriars | A glass structure with gray slats on higher floor; an entrance leads under a canopy with a sign reading "BLACKFRIARS STATION" into a large internal space seen through the glass, People are walking into the entrance and coming up steps from an underpass. | 30 May 1870 | Main line | Connects with National Rail services. | 51°30′42″N 000°06′11″W |
| Mansion House | A beige-bricked building with a rectangular, dark blue sign reading "MANSION HOUSE STATION" in white letters and a yellow sign reading "OFFICES TO LET" | 3 July 1871 | Main line | | 51°30′44″N 000°05′39″W |
| Cannon Street (WB) | A building | 6 October 1884 | Main line | Connects with National Rail services. | 51°30′37″N 000°05′27″W |
| Monument | An entrance in a larger building under a sign reading "MONUMENT STATION" reveals banisters leading down. A woman is walking out of the entrance | 6 October 1884 | Main line | Opened as Eastcheap, renamed The Monument in 1884. Escalator connection to Bank station giving connections with Central, Northern, Waterloo & City lines and DLR. | 51°30′47″N 000°05′17″W |
| Tower Hill | A grey, many-windowed castle with flags flying from its turrets in the background, several people walking in the foreground, and a bright sky above | 25 September 1882 | Main line | The Metropolitan Railway opened "Tower of London" but closed it in 1884 after the District Railway opened "Mark Lane" nearby. This station was renamed "Tower Hill" in 1946 and moved to the site of the "Tower of London" station in 1967. Connects with Circle line. | 51°30′36″N 000°04′34″W |
| Aldgate East | In the middle of building works a glass doors show banisters leading down beneath a sign reading "ALDGATE EAST STATION", this beneath a canopy supported on four girders. | 6 October 1884 | Main line | Connects with Hammersmith & City line. Moved to current position in 1938. | 51°30′55″N 000°04′20″W |
| Whitechapel | Two entrances on the ground floor of what looks like a terraced house between a shop with green sign reading "Fresh" and a building with a sign reading "Lecture Hall" above a door | 6 October 1884 | Main line | Connects with Windrush line and Elizabeth line services. Opened as Whitechapel (Mile End), renamed in 1901. | 51°31′08″N 000°03′40″W |
| Stepney Green | A brick building under a slate roof with a pale front; two arched doorways on the left and four arched windows to the right, above which a rectangular, dark blue sign reading "STEPNEY GREEN STATION" in white letters | 23 June 1902 | Main line | | 51°31′19″N 000°02′47″W |
| Mile End | A grey-bricked building with a rectangular, dark blue sign reading "MILE END STATION" in white letters all under a light blue sky with white clouds | 2 June 1902 | Main line | Cross platform interchange with Central line. | 51°31′30″N 000°01′59″W |
| Bow Road | A red-bricked building with a blue sign reading "BOW ROAD STATION" in white letters and a tree in the foreground all under a blue sky with white clouds | 11 June 1902 | Main line | | 51°31′38″N 000°01′29″W |
| Bromley-by-Bow | A squat bricked building behind a concrete wall with a dark blue sign reading "BROMLEY-BY-BOW STATION" in white letters | 2 June 1902 | Main line | Opened as LT&SR station in 1894. First served as Bromley, LT&SR station closed in 1940 and renamed in 1967. | 51°31′26″N 000°00′41″W |
| West Ham | A brown-bricked building with a large, grey sign reading "WEST HAM" in white letters and four people in front all under a light grey sky | 2 June 1902 | Main line | Connects with Jubilee line, Docklands Light Railway and National Rail services. Named West Ham (Manor Road) from 1924 to 1969, Metropolitan service began in 1941 and LT&SR station closed 1994. | 51°31′41″N 000°00′14″E |
| Plaistow | A red bricked cube shaped building with a rectangular, dark blue sign reading "PLAISTOW STATION" in white letters and people walking on the pavement in front | 2 June 1902 | Main line | LT&SR station opened in 1858. | 51°31′53″N 000°01′02″E |
| Upton Park | A red-and-brown bricked building with a rectangular, dark blue sign reading "UPTON PARK STATION" in white letters all under a light blue sky | 2 June 1902 | Main line | LT&SR station opened in 1877. | 51°32′06″N 000°02′04″E |
| East Ham | A red- and brown-bricked building with a blue sign reading "EAST HAM STATION" in white letters and people walking in front all under a white sky | 2 June 1902 | Main line | LT&SR station opened in 1858. | 51°32′20″N 000°03′06″E |
| Barking | A glass and steel building with a canopy, a row of shops at ground level. There is a bus waiting at a bus stop in front of the building, and cars waiting with people. A sign above an entrance readings "Barking" with symbols for National Rail and London Underground. | 2 June 1902 | Main line | Connects with National Rail and Suffragette line. LT&SR station opened in 1854. District Railway service withdrawn 1905–1908. | 51°32′21″N 000°04′54″E |
| Upney | | 12 September 1932 | Main line | | 51°32′19″N 000°06′05″E |
| Becontree | | 12 September 1932 | Main line | | 51°32′25″N 000°07′37″E |
| Dagenham Heathway | | 12 September 1932 | Main line | Opened as Heathway, renamed 1949. | 51°32′30″N 000°08′49″E |
| Dagenham East | | 2 June 1902 | Main line | Opened as Dagenham in 1885, District line service withdrawn 1905 to 1932 and station renamed 1949. | 51°32′40″N 000°09′56″E |
| Elm Park | | 13 May 1935 | Main line | | 51°32′59″N 000°11′52″E |
| Hornchurch | | 2 June 1902 | Main line | LT&SR station opened 1885, District line service withdrawn 1905 to 1932. | 51°33′11″N 000°13′08″E |
| Upminster Bridge | | 17 December 1934 | Main line | | 51°33′29″N 000°14′03″E |
| Upminster | | 2 June 1902 | Main line | LT&SR station opened 1885, District line service withdrawn 1905 to 1932. Connects with National Rail and Liberty line services. | 51°33′32″N 000°15′04″E |

=== Previously served stations ===
Now served by the Piccadilly line, the Hounslow branch opened to the now closed Hounslow Town on 1 May 1883 and was extended on a separate route to Hounslow West on 21 July 1884. The District line served the present Piccadilly line stations between Acton Town and Hounslow West as well as the former station of Osterley & Spring Grove (closed 1934) until District line services were withdrawn on 9 October 1964. From 13 June 1905 until 28 February 1959, the District line ran a one-stop shuttle between Acton Town and South Acton.

Also now served by the Piccadilly line, the South Harrow branch opened from north of Ealing Common on 28 June 1903 and extended over Metropolitan Railway tracks to Uxbridge on 1 March 1910. The District line served the present Piccadilly line stations between North Ealing and South Harrow until 4 July 1932 and the stations between Rayners Lane and Uxbridge until 25 October 1933. The District Railway also served the now closed Park Royal & Twyford Abbey until its replacement by Park Royal on 6 July 1931.

Between 1 March 1883 and 30 September 1885, the District Railway provided a service to Windsor, serving: West Ealing, Hanwell, Southall, Hayes & Harlington, West Drayton, Langley, Slough, and Windsor.

From 1910 to 1939, the District line's eastbound service ran as far as Southend-on-Sea and Shoeburyness.

Currently part of the East London line, the District Railway branched away from the main line west of Whitechapel and served stations between Shadwell and New Cross from 1 October 1884 until 31 July 1905.

Between Whitechapel and Aldgate East, the District line served St. Mary's (Whitechapel Road) from 1 October 1884 to 30 April 1938, closing when Aldgate East station moved.

From 25 September 1882 until its closure on 12 October 1884, Tower of London station was served by the District Railway.

=== Abandoned plans ===
In 1911, the Underground Electric Railways Company of London agreed to finance the construction of the Wimbledon and Sutton Railway and eight new stations for the extension of District Railway services to Sutton. Construction of the line was delayed by World War I and, as part of a deal with the Southern Railway (SR) to agree to the extension of the City and South London Railway to Morden, construction of the line was taken over by the SR.

=== Fictional stations ===
Walford East is a fictional District line station in the BBC television soap opera EastEnders, and since February 2010 episodes have used Computer-generated imagery (CGI) of District line trains running into the station. The production tube map situates this station in place of Bromley-by-Bow.

In the Sherlock episode "The Empty Hearse", a fictional unopened terminus station called Sumatra Road (situated underneath the Houses of Parliament as a disused branch line from Westminster Station) was created for the episode's story of a terrorism plot. The station was actually filmed at Aldwych with ex-Northern line 1972 stock which caused continuity errors as deep-level trains and tunnels were used when the District line is sub-surface.

West Ashfield tube station, despite its name, is a mock-up District line station on the third floor of a building used for training of TfL staff in a simulated environment; the "station" is slated to be closed by 2024. Maps within the facility show West Ashfield as a station on the District line between West Kensington and Earl's Court.

== See also ==
- Fourth rail
- Lillie Bridge Depot
