= Ravenscourt Park tube station =

London Underground station

Ravenscourt Park
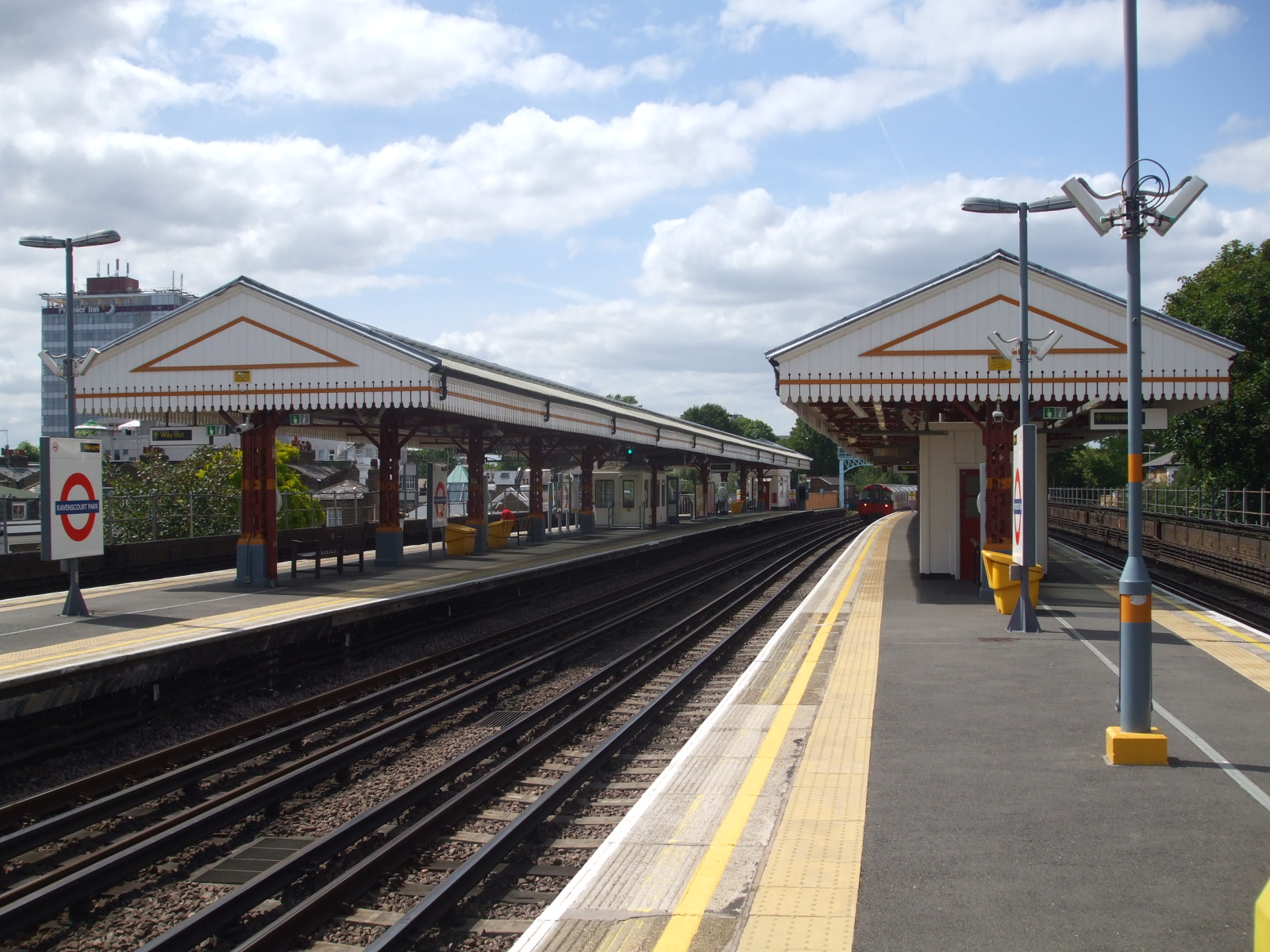
- Piccadilly line eastbound platform 3 at the station for Piccadilly line trains only
- Interactive map of Ravenscourt Park

General information
- Location: Ravenscourt Park
- Local authority: London Borough of Hammersmith and Fulham
- Managed by: London Underground
- Number of platforms: 4 (2 active, 2 inactive)
- Fare zone: 2

London Underground annual entry and exit
- 2020: ▼1.92 million
- 2021: ▼1.53 million
- 2022: ▲2.58 million
- 2023: ▲2.72 million
- 2024: ▲2.73 million

Railway companies
- Original company: London and South Western Railway

Key dates
- 1 January 1869: Line opened
- 1 April 1873: Station opened as Shaftesbury Road
- 1 June 1877: District Railway service introduced
- 1 October 1877: Metropolitan Railway service introduced
- 1 May 1878: Midland Railway "Super Outer Circle" service introduced
- 30 September 1880: "Super Outer Circle" service ceased
- 1 March 1888: Renamed Ravenscourt Park
- 1 January 1894: GWR service introduced
- 31 December 1906: Metropolitan service ceased
- 31 December 1910: GWR service ceased
- 3 June 1916: L&SWR service ceased

Other information
- External links: TfL station info page
- Coordinates: 51.49417°N 0.23583°W

Ravenscourt Park is a London Underground station in Hammersmith in west London. It is on the District line, between Stamford Brook and Hammersmith stations. The station is located between Dalling Road (B408) and Ravenscourt Road and is about 100 m north of King Street (A315). It takes its name from the nearby Ravenscourt Park and is in London fare zone 2.

Ravenscourt Park has four tracks serviced by two island platforms. The outside tracks are used by the District line. The Piccadilly line uses the inside tracks to pass the station, but does not stop here except on rare occasions, such as engineering works taking place on other sections of the District line, and during all-night services on New Year's Eve. London Assembly member Murad Qureshi has called for Piccadilly line trains to stop at Ravenscourt Park on a regular basis.

== History ==
The line through Ravenscourt Park station was opened on 1 January 1869 by the London and South Western Railway (L&SWR) on a new branch line to Richmond. The branch was built from the West London Joint Railway starting north of Addison Road station (now Kensington (Olympia)). The line ran through Shepherd's Bush and Hammersmith via a now closed curve and initially the next station west from Hammersmith (Grove Road) (also now closed) was Turnham Green.

Ravenscourt Park station was opened as Shaftesbury Road by the L&SWR on 1 April 1873.

On 1 June 1877, the District Railway (DR, now the District line) opened a short extension from its terminus at Hammersmith to connect to the L&SWR tracks east of Ravenscourt Park station. The DR then began running trains over the L&SWR tracks to Richmond. On 1 October 1877, the Metropolitan Railway (MR, now the Metropolitan line) also started a service to Richmond via Grove Road station.

On 5 May 1878, the Midland Railway began running a circuitous service known as the Super Outer Circle from St Pancras to Earl's Court via Cricklewood and South Acton. It operated over a now disused connection between the North London Railway and the L&SWR Richmond branch. The service was not a success and was ended on 30 September 1880.

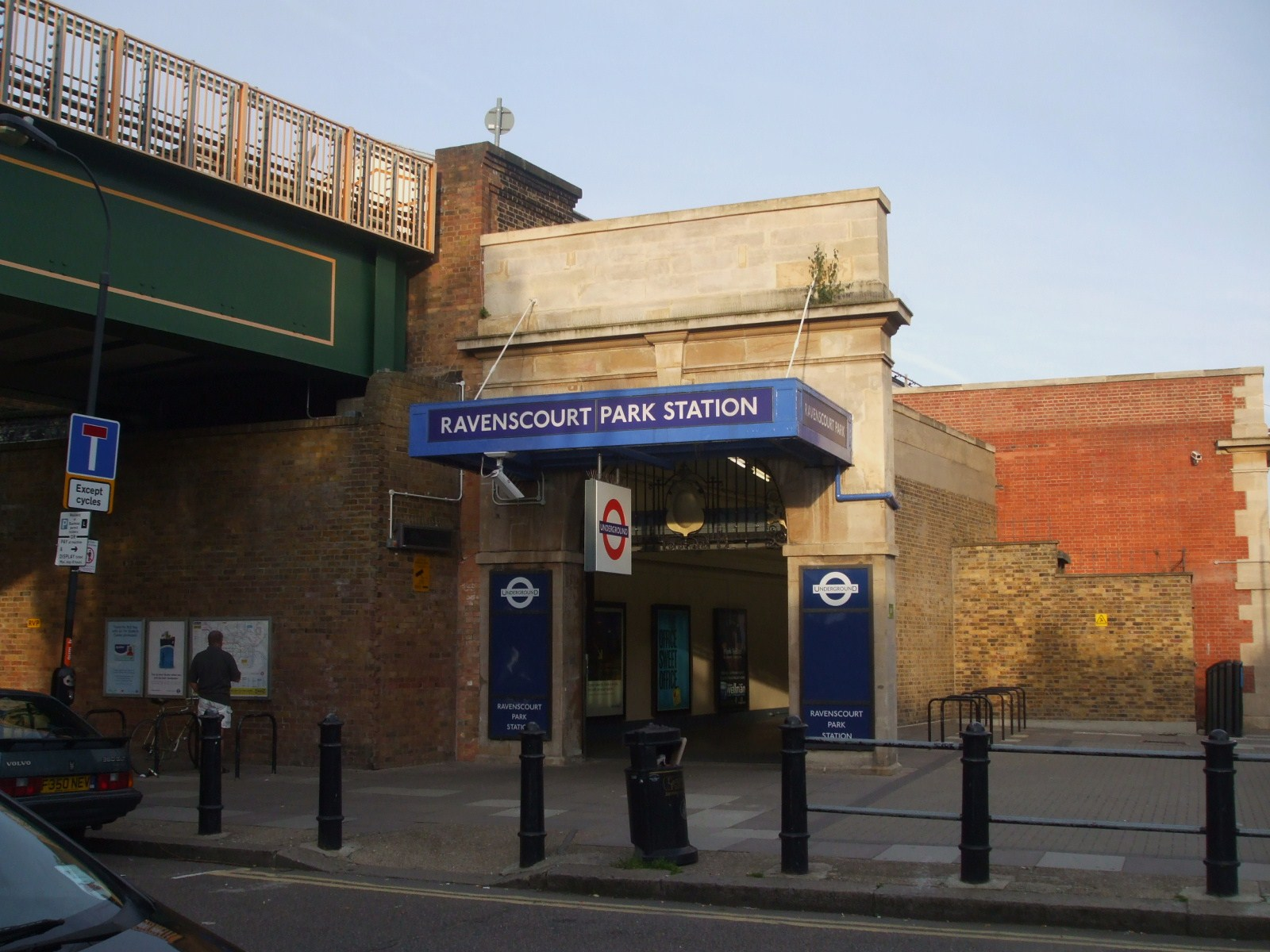
Ravenscourt Park main entrance

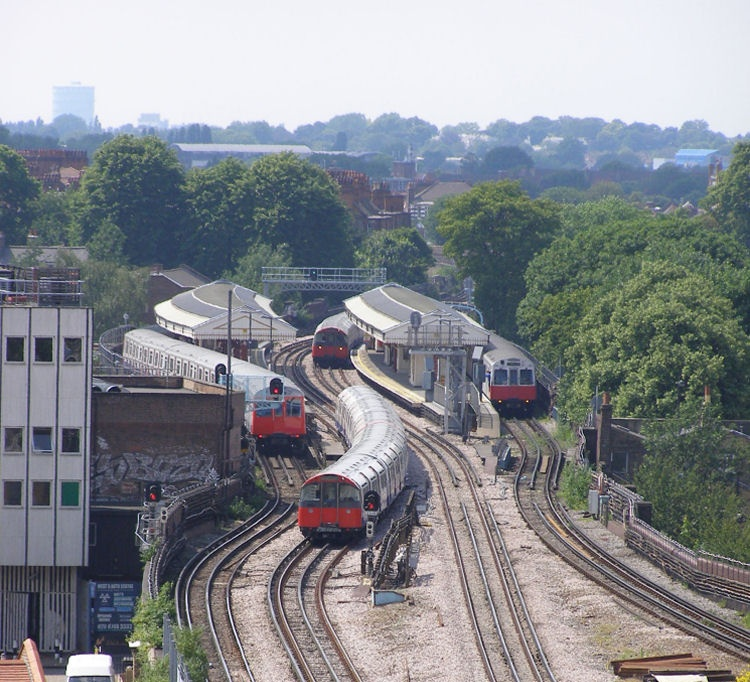
A four-way meet between two Piccadilly line trains and two District line trains at Ravenscourt Park from nearby King's Mall

Following an accident at Turnham Green on 9 April 1878 when a passenger fell trying to climb the 24 inches (610 mm) from the platform into a DR carriage, the platforms at Shaftesbury Road were experimentally raised from the L&SWR standard height of 1 foot 9 inches (530 mm) above rail level to 2 feet 10 inches (860 mm), which was lower than the DR standard height of 3 feet 1 1/2 inches (952 mm).

The Richmond branch was a major stimulus to residential development along the route and traffic on the line was high. The DR's service between Richmond, Hammersmith and central London was more direct than either the L&SWR's or the MR's routes via Grove Road station or the L&SWR's other route from Richmond via Clapham Junction, and it took much of the custom.

On 1 March 1888, the station was given its present name in advance of the nearby park being opened to the public.

From 1 January 1894, the GWR began sharing the MR's Richmond service and served Turnham Green once again, meaning that passengers from Ravenscourt Park could travel on the services of four operators.

Following the electrification of the DR's own tracks north of Acton Town in 1903, the DR funded the electrification of the tracks through Ravenscourt Park. The tracks between Acton Town and central London were electrified on 1 July 1905. DR services were operated with electric trains, but the L&SWR, GWR and MR services continued to be steam hauled.

MR services were withdrawn on 31 December 1906 and GWR services were withdrawn on 31 December 1910 leaving operations at Ravenscourt Park to the DR and L&SWR. The L&SWR constructed an additional pair of non-electrified tracks between Turnham Green and its junction with the District at Hammersmith and opened these on 3 December 1911 although their use was short-lived as the District's trains out-competed the L&SWR's to the extent that the L&SWR withdrew its service between Richmond and Addison Road on 3 June 1916, leaving the District as the sole operator.

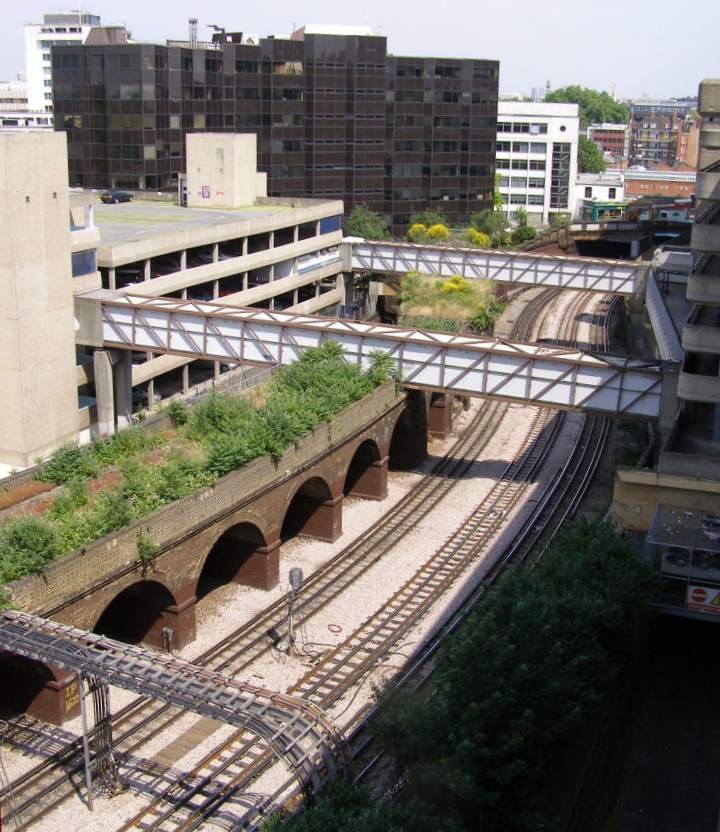
Abandoned viaduct on the approach to Grove Road station. From right to left: the westbound District and Piccadilly lines, the eastbound Piccadilly line, the abandoned viaduct; the eastbound District line is hidden behind it.

In the early 1930s, the London Electric Railway, precursor of the London Underground and owner of the District and Piccadilly lines, began the reconstruction of the tracks between Hammersmith and Acton Town to enable the Piccadilly line to be extended from Hammersmith to Uxbridge and Hounslow West (then the terminus of what is now the Heathrow branch). The inner tracks at Ravenscourt Park were designated for the Piccadilly line between the stopping lines of the District line. Services on the Piccadilly line began running through Ravenscourt Park on 4 July 1932.

To the east of the station, the remaining parts of the viaduct (pictured) taking the L&SWR's tracks to Grove Road station are situated between the eastbound District and Piccadilly lines on the approach to Hammersmith station.

== Station structure ==
The station has 2 island platforms and 4 tracks on a viaduct, grouped by direction, with each island serving trains in the same direction. Access to the platforms is by steps only.

The 4 platforms are numbered from the south to the north, serving the following lines:

1. District line (westbound)
2. Piccadilly line (westbound)
3. Piccadilly line (eastbound)
4. District line (eastbound)

The Piccadilly line platforms are unused, trains always pass through the platform without stopping, but are still in a usable state.

== Connections ==
London Buses routes 110, 190, 218, 267, 306 and H91 and night routes N9 N11 and N266 serve the station.

Preceding station	London Underground	Following station
Stamford Brook towards Ealing Broadway or Richmond	District line	Hammersmith towards Upminster, High Street Kensington or Edgware Road
Former services
Stamford Brook towards Richmond	London and South Western Railway (1869–1916)	Hammersmith (Grove Road) towards West Brompton
Turnham Green towards Richmond	Metropolitan Railway (1877–1906)	Hammersmith (Grove Road) towards Paddington
Turnham Green towards Richmond	Great Western Railway (1894–1910)	Hammersmith (Grove Road) towards Paddington
Turnham Green towards St Pancras	Midland Railway (1878–1880)	Hammersmith towards Earl's Court
Abandoned plans
Preceding station	London Underground	Following station
Stamford Brook towards Richmond	Central line (1920)	Hammersmith (Grove Road) towards Liverpool Street
