= Hammersmith (Grove Road) railway station =

London railway station, 1869–1916

Coordinates: 51°29′40″N 0°13′33″W

Hammersmith (Grove Road)
- Interactive map of Hammersmith (Grove Road)

General information
- Location: Hammersmith
- Owner: London and South Western Railway
- Number of platforms: 2

Key dates
- 1 January 1869: Opened (LSWR)
- 1870: Start/end (GWR)
- June 1877: Start (MR)
- 1 January 1894: Start (GWR)
- 31 December 1906: End (MR)
- 31 December 1910: End (GWR)
- 3 June 1916: Closed

Other information

Hammersmith (Grove Road) was a railway station on the London and South Western Railway (LSWR), located on Grove Road (now Hammersmith Grove) in Hammersmith, west London. It was opened in 1869 and closed in 1916.

For much of its existence, the station was also served by the Metropolitan Railway (MR; the precursor to today's Metropolitan line) and the Great Western Railway (GWR). Its site was adjacent to another station named Hammersmith, which today is served by the Circle and Hammersmith & City lines.

LSWR trains serving Hammersmith (Grove Road) ran from Waterloo via Addison Road (now called Kensington (Olympia)) to Richmond. MR and GWR trains ran from Paddington via the Hammersmith & City Railway (HCR; now the Hammersmith & City line) and also on to Richmond.

== History ==
1889 railway map of Hammersmith showing Grove Road station

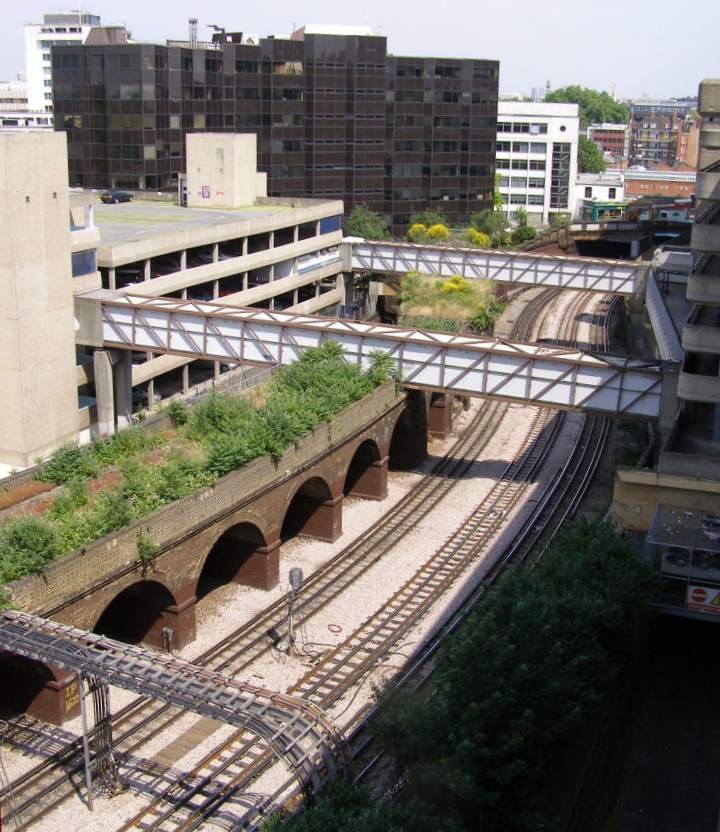
Abandoned viaduct looking east on approach to Hammersmith (Grove Road)

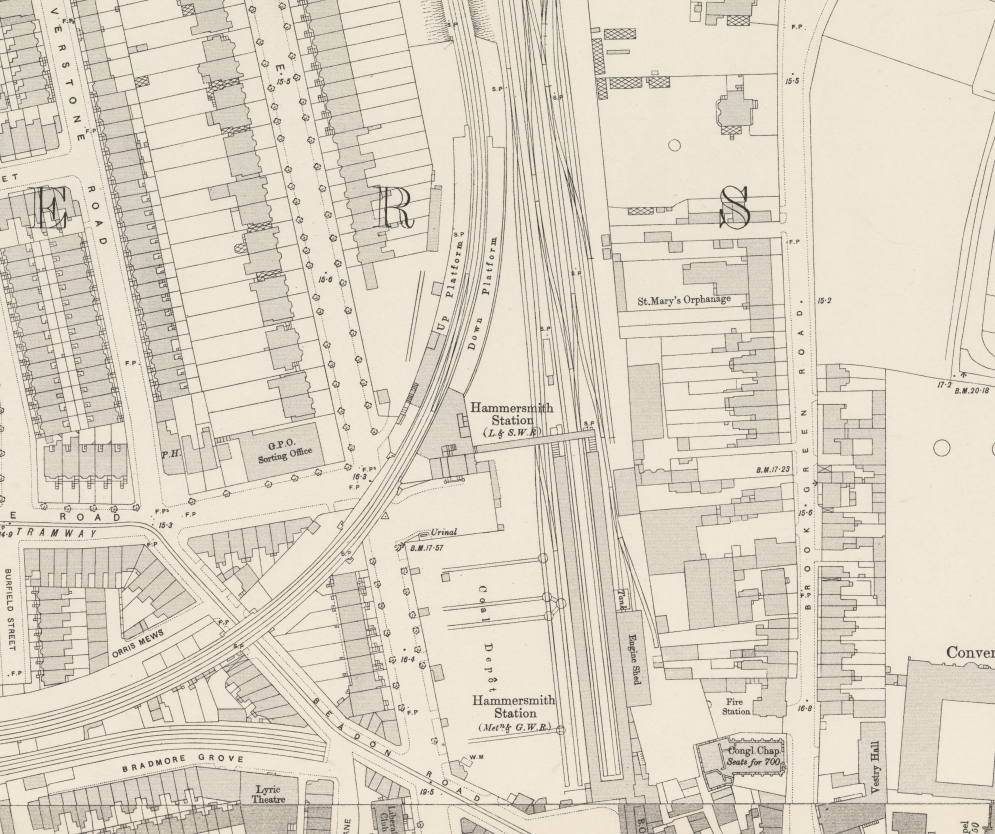
Hammersmith (Grove Road) station on an Ordnance Survey Map, 1894

Hammersmith (Grove Road), as it was officially named but often referred to as simply Hammersmith, was opened on 1 January 1869 by the LSWR on a new branch line from a junction with the West London Joint Railway (WLJR) north of Addison Road to Richmond via Turnham Green.

To the north of Hammersmith (Grove Road) the line ran parallel with the HCR before passing under the line and turning through a wide arc south of Shepherd's Bush before reaching the WLJR at a southward pointing junction. To the west of the station, the line became what is now the District line to Richmond, starting just to the east of Ravenscourt Park.

In 1870, Grove Junction was built north of the station connecting the HCR and LSWR tracks, enabling GWR trains on the HCR to access Hammersmith (Grove Road) and run on to Richmond. However, the GWR service ran for only a few months during 1870.

In June 1877, the District Railway (DR; now the District line) opened an extension from its own Hammersmith station to a junction (Studland Road Junction) to connect to the LSWR tracks east of Ravenscourt Park. From 1 October 1877, the MR began to run trains through Hammersmith (Grove Road) to Richmond. From 1 January 1894, the GWR also initiated services along this route.

The more direct route of the DR into central London had a competitive advantage over the other operators of the Richmond service and gradually the other railway companies ended their operations on the Richmond branch. MR services ended on 31 December 1906, shortly after the HCR tracks from Paddington were electrified. GWR services continued until 31 December 1910 and LSWR services continued until 3 June 1916 when the loop line between the Studland Road Junction and Addison Road was closed. The section west of the junction remains part of the District line.

In 1919 the Central London Railway (CLR; today's Central line) published plans to build a tunnelled link from west of its Shepherd's Bush station to the disused tracks north of the station so that it might run trains to Richmond via Hammersmith (Grove Road) and Turnham Green. Although authorisation was granted in 1920, the connection was never realised.

Hammersmith (Grove Road) was demolished in the mid 1950s having been used to store bananas until June 1954. The tracks on the loop line to the WLJR were lifted in 1932. Further demolition continued into the 1950s with the bridge over Grove Road being demolished. Although remnants of the viaduct at the Studland Road Junction where the LSWR tracks turned north-east are still visible west of the current Hammersmith station on the District and Piccadilly lines. The station site is now occupied by an office block on Hammersmith Grove.

Disused railways
Ravenscourt Park towards Richmond	London and South Western Railway (1869–1916)	Shepherd's Bush towards West Brompton
Preceding station	London Underground	Following station
Ravenscourt Park towards Richmond	Metropolitan Railway (1877–1906)	Shepherd's Bush towards Paddington
Abandoned plans
Preceding station	London Underground	Following station
Ravenscourt Park towards Richmond	Central line (1920)	Shepherd's Bush towards Liverpool Street
