= Richmond station (London) =

London Underground, London Overground and National Rail station

Richmond
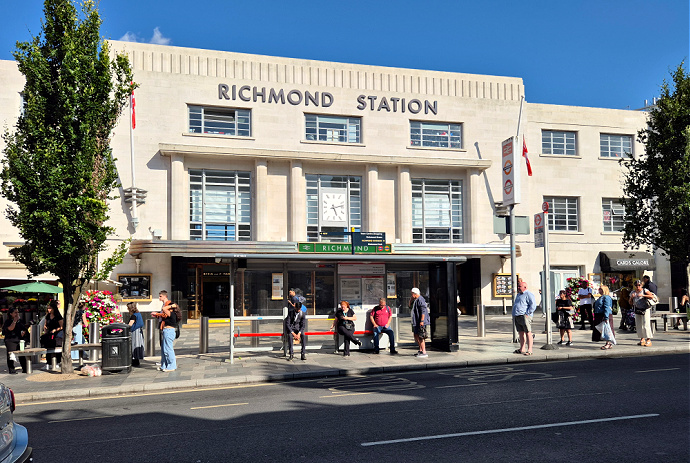
- Station entrance after completion of its refurbishment in 2025
- Interactive map of Richmond

General information
- Location: Richmond
- Local authority: London Borough of Richmond upon Thames
- Managed by: South Western Railway; London Underground; London Overground
- Owner: Network Rail
- Station code: RMD
- DfT category: B
- Number of platforms: 7
- Accessible: Yes
- Fare zone: 4

London Underground annual entry and exit
- 2021: ▲2.20 million
- 2022: ▲3.74 million
- 2023: ▲8.88 million
- 2024: ▲11.47 million
- 2025: ▲12.43 million

National Rail annual entry and exit
- 2020–21: ▼2.699 million
- Interchange: ▼0.329 million
- 2021–22: ▲6.424 million
- Interchange: ▲0.780 million
- 2022–23: ▲7.925 million
- Interchange: ▲1.030 million
- 2023–24: ▲8.887 million
- Interchange: ▲1.055 million
- 2024–25: ▲9.516 million
- Interchange: ▲1.111 million

Key dates
- 27 July 1846: Opened as Terminus (R&WER)
- 1848: Station moved (WS&SWR)
- 1 January 1869: Opened (L&SWR via Hammersmith)
- 1 January 1869: Started (NLR)
- 1870: Started and Ended (GWR)
- 1 June 1877: Started (DR)
- 1 October 1877: Started (MR)
- 1 January 1894: Started (GWR)
- 31 December 1906: Ended (MR)
- 31 December 1910: Ended (GWR)
- 3 June 1916: Ended (L&SWR via Hammersmith)
- 1 August 1937: Stations merged (SR)

Other information
- External links: Departures; Facilities
- Coordinates: 51.463°N 0.300°W

Richmond, also known as Richmond (London), is an interchange station in Richmond, Greater London on the Waterloo to Reading and North London lines in London fare zone 4. It is a western terminus of both the District line of the London Underground and the Mildmay line of the London Overground. National Rail services operated by South Western Railway on the Waterloo to Reading Line are routed through Richmond, which is between North Sheen and St Margarets stations, 9 miles 57 chains (15.6 km) down the line from London Waterloo.

== Architecture ==
The station building dates from 1937, designed by Southern Railway chief architect James Robb Scott in Art Deco style. Its Portland stone facade includes a square clock. The area in front of the station main entrance was pedestrianised in 2013 and includes a war memorial to soldier Bernard Freyberg, who was born in Richmond.

== History ==
The Richmond and West End Railway (R&WER) opened the first station at Richmond on 27 July 1846, as the terminus of its line from Clapham Junction. This station was on a site to the south of the present through platforms, which later became a goods yard and where a multi-storey car park now stands. The Windsor, Staines and South Western Railway (WS&SWR) extended the line westward, resiting the station to the west side of The Quadrant, on the extended tracks and slightly west of the present through platforms. Both the R&WER and WS&SWR were subsidiary companies of the London and South Western Railway (L&SWR).

On 1 January 1869, the L&SWR opened the Kensington and Richmond line from north of Addison Road station (now Kensington (Olympia) station) on the West London Joint Railway. This line ran through Hammersmith (Grove Road) station, since closed, and Turnham Green and had connection with the North & South Western Junction Railway (N&SWJR) near Gunnersbury. Most of this line is now part of the London Underground District line; the line south from Gunnersbury was also served by the North London Railway (NLR) and is now used also by London Overground. Before this line was built, services north from Richmond ran somewhat circuitously via chords at Kew Bridge and Barnes.

The Great Western Railway (GWR) briefly (1 June to 31 October 1870) ran a service from Paddington to Richmond via the Hammersmith & City Railway (now the Hammersmith & City line) tracks to Grove Road and then over the L&SWR tracks through Turnham Green.

On 1 June 1877, the District Railway (DR) linked its then terminus at Hammersmith to the nearby L&SWR tracks east of the present Ravenscourt Park station. The DR began running trains over the L&SWR tracks to Richmond. On 1 October 1877, the Metropolitan Railway (MR, now the Metropolitan line) restarted the former GWR service to Richmond via Grove Road station.

The DR route from Richmond to central London via Hammersmith was more direct than those of the NLR via Willesden Junction, of the L&SWR and the MR via Grove Road station and of the L&SWR via Clapham Junction to Waterloo. From 1 January 1894, the GWR began sharing the MR Richmond service, resulting in Gunnersbury having the services of five operators.

After electrifying its tracks north of Acton Town in 1903, the DR funded the electrification, completed on 1 August 1905, from Gunnersbury to Richmond. The DR ran electric trains on the branch, while the L&SWR, NLR, GWR and MR services continued to be steam hauled.

MR services ceased on 31 December 1906 and those of the GWR on 31 December 1910, leaving operations northwards through Kew Gardens and Gunnersbury to the DR, the NLR and L&SWR. On 3 June 1916, the L&SWR withdrew its service from Richmond to Addison Road through Hammersmith due to competition from the District line, leaving the District as the sole operator over that route and the NLR providing main line services via Willesden Junction.

Under the grouping of 1923, the L&SWR became part of the Southern Railway (SR) and the NLR became part of the London, Midland and Scottish Railway (LMS); both were subsequently nationalised into British Railways. On 1 August 1937, the SR opened its rebuilt station with the station building and the through platforms moved east to be next to the terminal platforms. At around the same time, the SR moved the goods yard from the site of the original terminus to a new location north-east of the station.

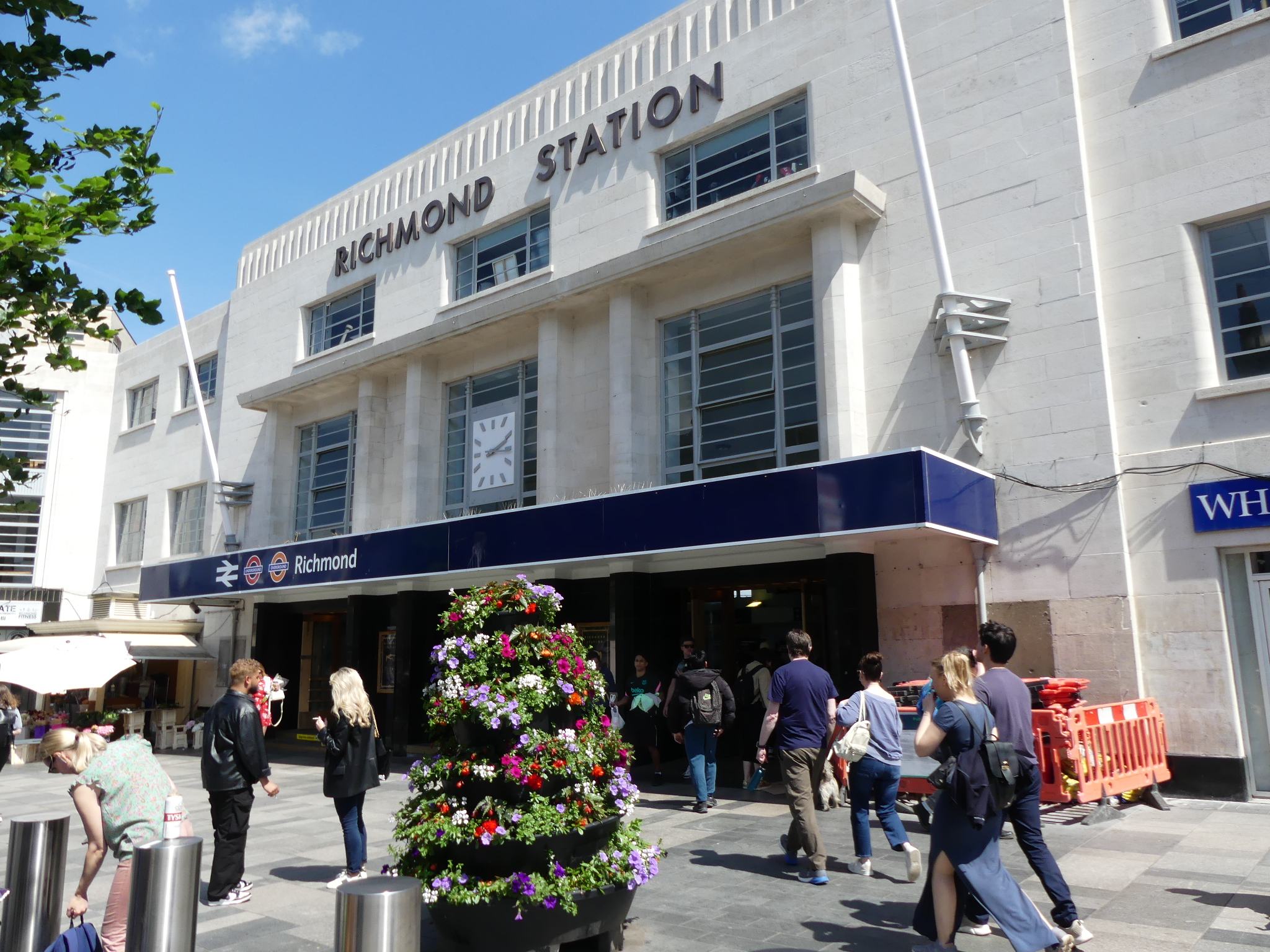
The state of the station halfway during the refurbishment, where the lettering and flag poles have been erected

Between 2023 and 2025, the station underwent refurbishment, restoring many of its historic Art Deco features and the installation of a new mural commemorating twinning with Fontainebleau in France and Konstanz in Germany.

=== Accident ===
On 18 September 1987, an accident occurred at Richmond when a westbound District line hit the buffers of platform 6 and broke the glass panels behind. No passengers were seriously injured.

=== Crossrail ===
A Crossrail branch to Kingston upon Thames via Richmond was proposed in 2003, but was dropped in 2004 due to a combination of local opposition, complex choices and engineering at the start of the route, cost, and insufficient return on investment. It could have run either overland or via a tunnel to Turnham Green and on the existing track through Gunnersbury to Richmond (which would have lost the District line service) and thence to Kingston.

== Platforms ==
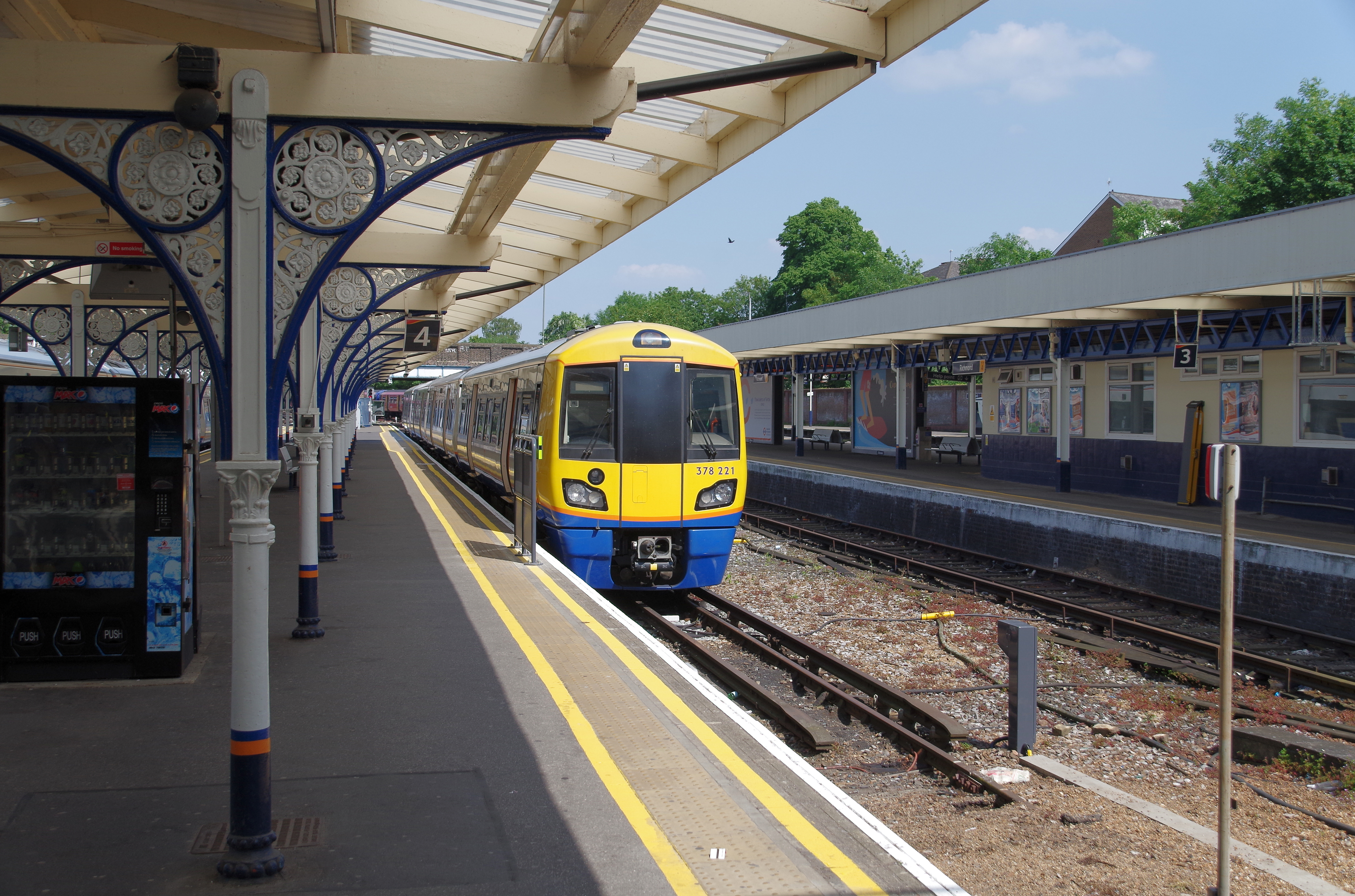
An Overground train at the station

The station has seven platforms numbered from south to north:

- Platforms 1 and 2 are through platforms for South Western Railway services.
- Platforms 3 to 7 are terminating platforms used by:
  - London Overground Mildmay line services (normally platforms 4 and 5 but sometimes 3, 6 and 7)
  - London Underground District line services (normally platforms 6 and 7. Occasionally 4 and 5 but never 3 due to 3's lack of a fourth rail, which the District Line uses for electric power).

As of September 2011, work was under way to extend platforms 1 and 2 to accept 10-car trains. The bulk of the lengthening was to be at the west (country) end; extending eastwards was deemed unviable by Network Rail as Church Road Bridge would have needed widening. As part of these works, the platform canopies were also being refurbished.

The wide gap between platforms 3 and 4 originally had a third, run-around track for steam locomotives.

The station has eight retail units. There are four eatery-cafés on alternate sides of the barriers (two on the rail side being thin and smaller) and two kiosks, the upper one being a hot drinks kiosk through to a M&S Simply Food grocery store. A florist and a WH Smith flank the entrance.

== Services ==
Services at Richmond are operated by South Western Railway, London Overground on the Mildmay line and London Underground on the District line.

The typical off-peak service in trains per hour is:

- 2 tph between London Waterloo and Reading. These services are the fastest services to London Waterloo, calling at Clapham Junction only intermediately.
- 2 tph between London Waterloo and Windsor & Eton Riverside. These services call at Putney, Clapham Junction and Vauxhall on the way to London Waterloo.
- 2 tph in each direction on the loop service via Teddington, returning to London Waterloo via Kingston and Wimbledon, calling at all stations.
- 4 tph to Stratford via Willesden Junction
- 6 tph to Upminster via Tower Hill

Additional services, including trains to and from Shepperton, Camberley, Aldershot and London Waterloo via Hounslow call at the station during the peak hours.

Preceding station	National Rail	Following station
Putney or Clapham Junction	South Western Railway Waterloo to Reading Line	Twickenham
North Sheen	South Western Railway Kingston Loop Line	St Margarets
Preceding station	London Overground	Following station
Terminus	Mildmay line North London line	Kew Gardens towards Stratford
Preceding station	London Underground	Following station
Terminus	District line	Kew Gardens towards Upminster

== Connections ==
A large number of London Buses routes serve the station day and night.
