= Murder of Jean Bradley =

1993 high-profile murder in London

- Bradley c. 1993

- Murder of Jean Bradley (Greater London)
- Date: 25 March 1993
- Time: 7:30pm
- Location: Carbery Avenue, Acton, London; 51.5030°N 0.2852°W
- Cause: Stabbing

The murder of Jean Bradley was the apparently motiveless stabbing of a woman in Acton, London on 25 March 1993. The case made headline news at the time due to a dramatic chase of the killer by a witness and since it was the second unexplained stabbing of a woman in west London in the early 1990s following the murder of Penny Bell in 1991.

Several people witnessed the murder and a passing carpenter came face-to-face with the killer during a confrontation before pursuing him for over a mile as he ran from the scene, with the attacker being last seen walking up Buckland Walk towards Acton High Street. The murderer, described as a strange individual, was noted for wearing a peculiar sou'wester hat and had been carrying the knife he used to repeatedly stab Bradley inside a black bag.

A local man with severe mental health problems was charged with the murder later in the year after key witnesses, including the man who had chased him, picked him out in identification parades. However, a magistrate unexpectedly dismissed the case against him in the early stages due to the fact that other witnesses had not identified him. No other suspects have ever been arrested or charged since. In 2008, the case returned to the news when there was speculation linking the murder to Robert Napper, who had just been convicted of the killing of Rachel Nickell. However, no links were found and Napper does not match the descriptions given by the witnesses who saw and confronted the killer. The murder remains unsolved.

== Murder ==
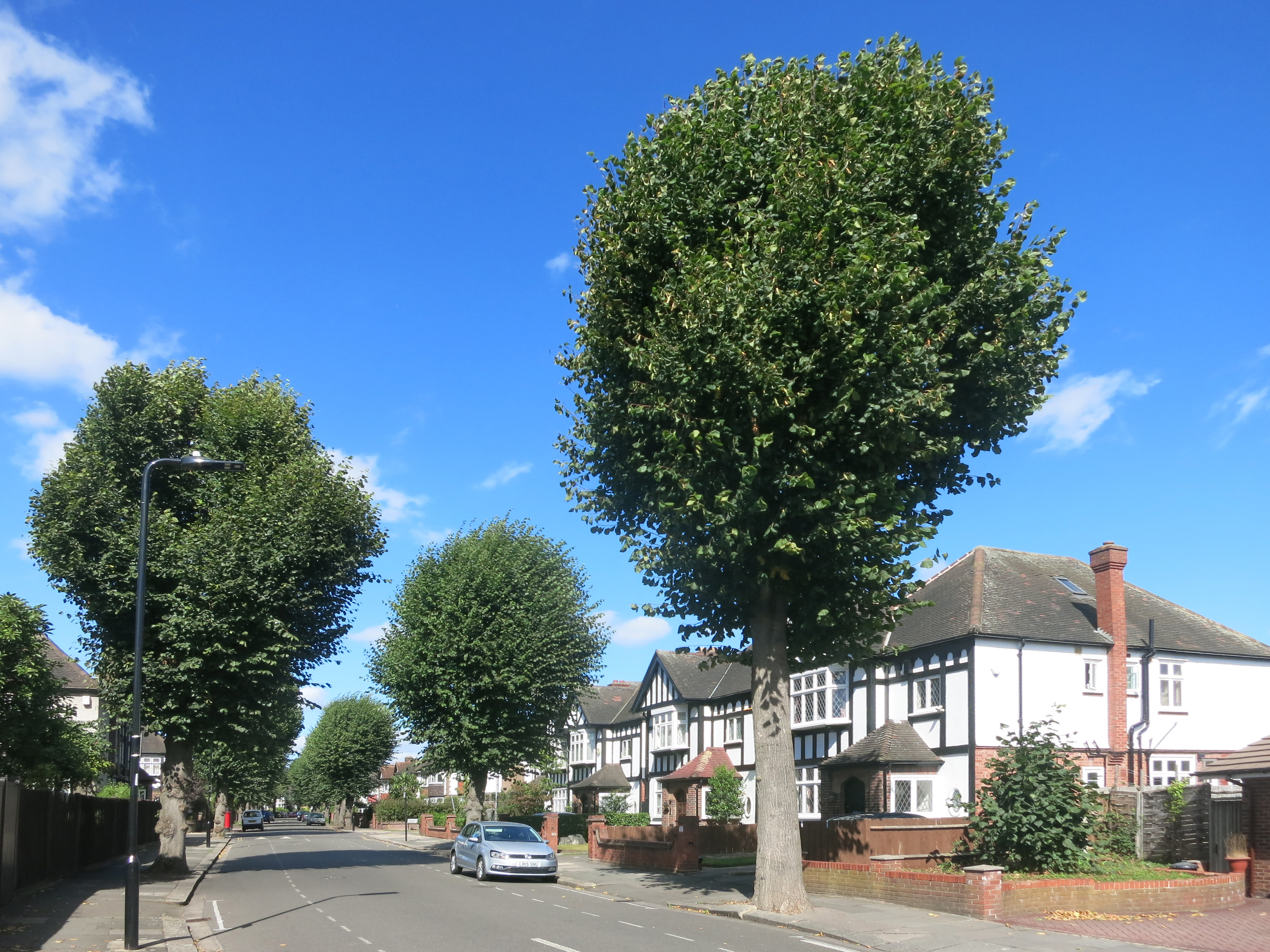
The location of the murder on Carbery Avenue

Bradley was a 47-year-old businesswoman who lived in Crowthorne, Berkshire with her boyfriend, teacher Nicholas Osbourne. She specialised in helping businesses move to new premises and her office was located on New Bond Street in London, 30 miles from her home. When she first got the job she decided that the best way to commute to work would be to drive half-way in to Acton Town tube station and then get to the London Underground for the rest of the journey. She and her housemate had specifically decided that the best place to park for Acton Town station was in Carbery Avenue nearby, since it seemed to be a safe street in a respectable area.

On the day she was murdered, Thursday 25 March 1993, Bradley parked her BMW car as usual in the morning in Carbery Avenue. After finishing work she travelled home that evening from Green Park to Acton Town station on the Piccadilly Line, arriving at Acton Town at 7:20pm. On route to her parked car in Carbery Avenue she stopped off to buy some cans of drink, and another commuter reported walking past her in Gunnersbury Gardens on her way to her vehicle. No one else was in the street at this time. As she was about to get into her car a man suddenly and randomly attacked Bradley, causing her to scream and attract attention from residents and passers-by.

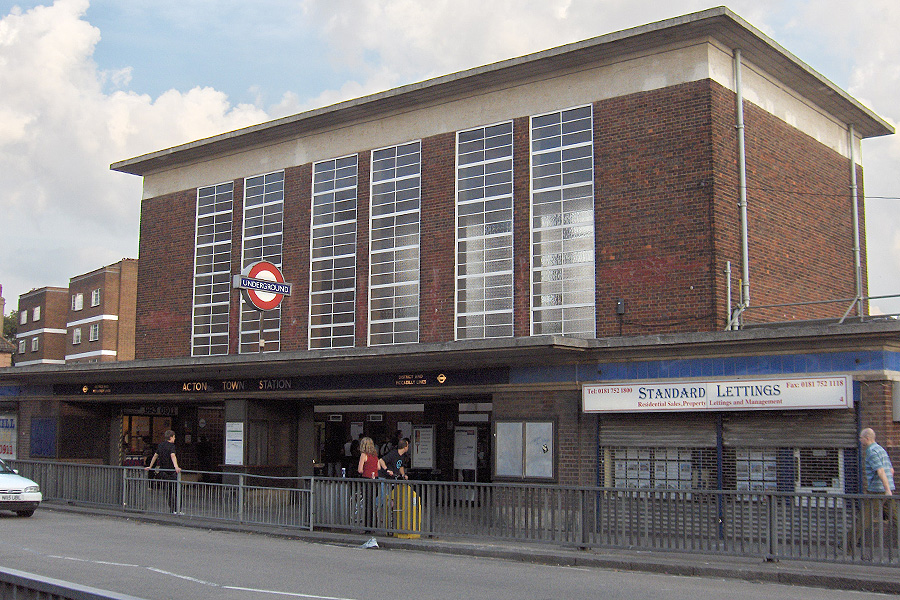
Bradley was attacked shortly after leaving Acton Town tube station.

A carpenter driving past saw the pair struggle and he stopped to confront the attacker, who started to run off. The carpenter chased him down the street, witnessed by others, and came face-to-face with the attacker, who threatened him with a knife wrapped in a black bag, saying "You will get it as well" or "I'll have you". The attacker was tall and gaunt with drawn-in cheeks and prominent cheekbones. He had two days of stubble, and most notably was wearing a black sou'wester hat, which was particularly unusual as it was a dry night. Furthermore, it appeared to be made from a black bin liner. He was in his late thirties or early forties and was of slim build. After the witness confronted the man, the two men ran off into Gunnersbury Lane just off the North Circular Road.

Passers-by quickly came to Bradley's aid, but attempts by paramedics to revive her failed. She had been stabbed eight times in total and the eight-inch long weapon was believed to be either a butcher's knife or a carving knife. She had cuts to her hands where she had tried to fight with her attacker and grab the knife.

== Pursuit of killer ==
Police artist's impression of the murderer. He was wearing a sou'wester hat

After chasing the killer into Gunnersbury Lane the carpenter pursued the man as he ran towards Acton Town station, and a woman in a vehicle who had also witnessed the initial events drove past the pair again, getting a good view of the attacker. The murderer then turned into Bollo Lane and into Bollo Bridge Road and the South Acton Estate, all the time being followed by the carpenter. At the edge of the estate the carpenter almost caught up with the man, who appeared to be unfit as he did not attempt to take a shortcut by jumping over a low railing. They then passed into Church Road, where the carpenter lost the man near the Prince of Wales pub (79 Church Road). However, a man watching from the top of his block of flats saw the killer's next move, which was to hide in the doorway of flats on Ragley Close. The killer took his hat off, revealing to the witness that he had jet black hair. He was also wearing a 3/4 length cream Parka coat and the witness reported him being "definitely" flat-footed. The witness said the man then started looking around him and looked for a way to get out of the estate. The attacker was last seen walking up Buckland Walk towards Acton High Street, a mile and a half away from where Bradley had been stabbed.

Altogether, there were seven sightings reported of the chase.

== Investigation ==
The murder of Bradley made front-page news, because of the dramatic chase by the carpenter and as it seemed very similar to the unsolved murder of Penny Bell nearby only two years earlier. However, investigators quickly concluded that the murders were not linked. Comparisons were also made in the press between the murders of Bradley, Rachel Nickell and Alison Shaughnessy, although police also said there was no links to these cases.

No motive for the murder of Bradley could be found, with nothing of hers being stolen and her not having been sexually assaulted. Initially it was considered that the only possible motivation could have been a robbery which had gone wrong, but Bradley's handbag was left lying on the back seat of the car she was getting into when she was attacked. The murderer was described as clearly a strange character who had probably come to the notice of those in psychiatric services, or those working with individuals with drink or drug problems. An appeal on the murder was made on the prime-time television programme Crimewatch three weeks after the attack, on which detectives appealed for information from those working in such professions to come forward if they had information on the man. It was suggested that he could have bought his clothes from charity shops, and it was also revealed that many people who had witnessed the chase had not come forward, with the lead detective pleading for them to help catch the man. The killer was described as someone who did not appear to look after himself very well, and that his gauntness made him stand out.

A piece of plastic from the bag the attacker had wrapped around the weapon was recovered from the murder scene. It had a distinctive logo on it, had the brand name "Narcissus" on it and had on it the wording "EXTRUDED PRINTED AND ...IN THE UNITED...", with the other words indecipherable. The bag was traced to a manufacturing company in Ayrshire. It was discovered that the bag was used by a health food shop and a photographic company in Fleet Street but was no longer manufactured. Detectives also discovered that a street vendor was knocking door-to-door around the time of the murder on Carbery Avenue, and he was described as 20 years old. He was not believed to be involved in the attack at all but was apparently a crucial witness and police pleaded for this man to come forward. A £20,000 reward was offered for information leading to the capture of the killer, and a mobile police station was set up on Ragley Close by where the murderer was last sighted.

Because several people had seen the killer, including the carpenter who had seen him face-to-face, the lead detective said that "when we find the man, we will have no difficulty with identification". Detectives said that they believed the killer had local knowledge because of the route he took during the chase. It was revealed that a number of people had reported seeing a man matching the description of the killer behaving in a suspicious way in Acton and on trains around west London.

== Charging of suspect and release ==
Francis Marnell after his arrest

On 28 August 1993, 5 months after the murder, unemployed 39-year-old Francis "Frank" Marnell of Downside Walk, Northolt was charged with the murder. The news of this charge was reported on Crimewatch in September, with it being revealed that two locals had originally brought police attention to the individual. Marnell had a history of mental illness, regularly had bouts of psychosis and had problems with drugs. He had been living in a bed and breakfast hotel at the time of the murder. When questioned by police he denied the murder but accepted he may have done it and could not remember. He had also voluntarily called the police to say that he might have been in the area when Bradley was killed, waiting at Acton Town tube station for a girlfriend. Significantly, the carpenter who had chased the killer and gone face-to-face with him picked out Marnell at an identification parade, later testifying at court: "The minute I walked through the door he caught my eye". Another eyewitness had also identified Marnell as the killer, and a third eyewitness said that they were "98 per cent" certain that he was the man. It was reported that Crimewatch viewers had called police to say that he fitted the description given by witnesses. Other suspects were able to be eliminated.

At a magistrates hearing on 11 November 1993 the man was freed after the magistrate decided that the evidence against Marnell was not strong enough. Other witnesses (who had not got as close to the man as the carpenter) had picked out other men as the killer in identification parades, and two friends of Marnell claimed he had an alibi. A police spokesman told the press: "This result came as a shock and we are disappointed", while lead detective Bob Fenton commented: "Nothing shocks me in the criminal justice system". The Crown Prosecution Service had already known about the 'alibi' evidence beforehand but had granted permission to charge, indicating that they disregarded the claimed alibi. After the case collapsed, detectives said they would be liaising with the CPS on the next steps they would take.

After Marnell was freed, the producer of Crimewatch wrote a letter complaining to The Guardian newspaper about their coverage, noting that the paper had wrongly claimed that Marnell was named as a suspect for "looking like the actor" in the programme and highlighting that although some had failed to pick Marnell out, the carpenter (the main witness) repeatedly insisted that the man he had chased was indeed Marnell.

== Continuing publicity ==
Bradley's murder was highlighted again by The Independent in 2000, when they revealed that the Metropolitan Police had the worst clear-up rate for murder in Britain. In 2001 it was reported that the Bradley murder would be one of several subject to new forensic examinations in attempts to solve the case.

In 2008, after the conviction of Robert Napper for the murder of Rachel Nickell on Wimbledon Common in 1992, it was reported that detectives would investigate Napper on possible links to the Bradley murder, as well as to the murder of Claire Tiltman in 1993 (which he was later proven to have not committed) and the murder of Penny Bell. The murder of Bradley was subsequently mentioned in Laurence Alison and Marie Eyres's 2009 book on Napper titled Killer in the Shadows: The Monstrous Crimes of Robert Napper. On 28 March 2013, an episode of Criminologist David Wilson's series Killers Behind Bars: The Untold Story aired that investigated possible links between Napper and the Bradley murder.

Bradley's murder has been noted as one of the most notorious unsolved UK cases. The case continues to receive publicity.
