= South Acton, London =

Area of Acton, London, England

Coordinates: 51.500190°N 0.286235°W

South Acton
- Location within Greater London
- OS grid reference: TQ205805
- London borough: Ealing; Hounslow
- Ceremonial county: Greater London
- Region: London
- Country: England
- Sovereign state: United Kingdom
- Post town: LONDON
- Postcode district: W3, W4
- Dialling code: 020
- Police: Metropolitan
- Fire: London
- Ambulance: London
- UK Parliament: Ealing Central and Acton
- London Assembly: Ealing and Hillingdon; South West

South Acton is an area in Acton, West London, 6.4 miles (10.3 km) west of Charing Cross. At the 2001 census, Acton, comprising the wards of East Acton, Acton Central, South Acton and Southfield, had a population of 53,689 people.

The area is dominated by the South Acton housing estate, a large public housing estate owned by Ealing Council. There are some 2,000 residential dwellings on the estate, covering approximately 25 hectares of land. These are accommodated in a range of principally medium to high rise blocks. The estate also provides shops, a youth club, a community centre, a nursery, school buildings and open space.

The area is well served by transport links. Acton Town, a major interchange for the District and Piccadilly lines, with links to Heathrow and the West End is on the western boundary. On the southern boundary is South Acton railway station, a London Overground station running north through to Stratford and south to Richmond. The site is bounded to the north by Acton High Street, to the south by the London Overground railway line, to the east by a Victorian residential neighbourhood and to the west by Bollo Lane and the tube lines. To the south east, on the other side of the railway line, lie the suburban residential areas of Acton Green and Bedford Park.

The estate and area is also particularly diverse. Historically, the area has been important for Irish working-class immigrants, and recently this has been supplemented by Indian, Afro-Caribbean and Somali immigration. Currently the population is 52% white, including 5% of Irish descent, 24% Afro-Caribbean, 16% Asian, with the last 8% being of other ethnic origins. A great range of first languages other than English are spoken at the local school.

Historically, the estate and the area has suffered from a poor reputation, in particular because of high levels of crime and drug dealing and use. However, recent efforts by the Council, Ealing Homes (the council's housing management company) and local residents have seen improvements in the area from 2005 onwards.

Since 1999, the South Acton estate has been undergoing a regeneration which has resulted in significant improvements in both housing and community.

== History of South Acton estate ==
The area was originally built to a traditional Victorian street pattern with medium density terraced housing occupying the majority of the site. Although initially having good north/south links, the construction of the railway lines created a permanent barrier in these areas. In the post war period, the area was earmarked for comprehensive redevelopment that would involve clearance of the 19th century properties labelled as slums. This was a common response by local authorities to the problems of poor housing after the war and it led to the proliferation of medium and high rise system built housing estates, influenced by Modernist ideals of Le Corbusier. Government subsidies and local politics also encouraged the production of system built and high rise housing. The council embarked on comprehensive redevelopment in 1949 with the construction of Bollo Court. The redevelopment continued over the 50s, 60s and 70s with a variety of styles and archetypes.

=== Property types and description ===
The central area of the site comprises 1960's tower blocks and slab blocks, including Charles Hocking House, Barwick House, Hardy Court, Carisbrooke and Ludlow Courts, which are set in a generous open pedestrian space, located to the north of Bollo Bridge Road. Although geographically close to the red brick area to the north of the site and the blocks to west of the site, the area is isolated by a lack of interconnecting roads.

The west area of the estate is bordered by Bollo Lane to the west, the industrial area and Bollo Bridge Road to the south, and the Victorian Housing along Heathfield Road to the north. The existing infant and junior schools with associated open space create an eastern boundary. The west area predominately comprises a mixture of mid to high rise tower blocks. Geographically this area is closest to Acton Town tube station and its excellent public transport connections. The last part of the site to be built dates from the late 1970s and is commonly referred to as the ‘red brick’ area, located at the north of the site, adjacent to the town centre. This area comprises a mixture of low rise and high rise blocks, with a large number of now unused underground car parks. It has a sloping site topography and lack of through roads, and is characterised by complex deck access circulation patterns, which are difficult to negotiate as a pedestrian.

Generally the estate is characterised by a series of slab blocks and towers set in mature landscaped open spaces which exploit the natural topography of the site. Flats on the upper floors of many of the taller buildings have extensive views across London. Some of the original inhabitants of the estate are still resident and can recall how pleasant it was when newly built. Traditionally the area was well served by local industries such as Wilkinson Sword and Lucas Aerospace but the last decade has witnessed a decline in traditional manufacturing employment and a steady deterioration of the physical environment.

The Council has been severely limited in its ability to invest in the fabric of buildings and the estate since it was built, primarily in the 1960s and 1970s. The buildings themselves and the public realm are now tired and significant new investment is necessary.

In 1999, NBA Consortium Services carried out a Stock Condition Survey. This identified a number of problems and shortfalls with the existing stock. These included need for concrete repairs, roof repairs, window replacements, better insulation standards, upgrading of lifts and common parts, access control and security as well as the need for improvements internally and to external spaces.

== Local services and facilities ==
There are a number of services and facilities within easy reach of South Acton.

=== Transport ===
The estate is well served by public transport. Acton Town underground station (Piccadilly and District lines) provides access to the West End in 20 minutes and Heathrow Airport in a similar time. South Acton station (London Overground) has trains to Richmond and Stratford). The underground station is earmarked for a £2.5m refurbishment in the near future by London Underground. There is, in addition, planning approval for a new station to serve Chiswick Park Phase 2, but this is currently on hold. Crossrail proposals, if they go ahead, will mean a fast connection between Paddington and Acton Central station.

For car users the location offers quick access to the A40 to the north and the A4/M4 to the south.

=== Retail ===
Acton High Street is the main local shopping centre, but has limited shopping facilities, although it does have a Morrison's supermarket. Some local residents also use the Sainsbury's in Chiswick. In July 2017 a Sainsbury's local opened on Palmerston road next to South Acton overground station. In addition there are a number of shops around Acton Town underground station. The main local shopping facilities are the Bollo Bridge Road shops, some of which are under used or closed. The Post Office was well used and seen as an important community facility. However, as part of the post office closures programme it was closed. In addition there are further shops on Hanbury Road, some of which are presently well used and some converted for nursery use. There are a few additional shops, one in the south area of the estate and two in the north, which are now closed.

=== Community and leisure ===
Local leisure facilities include Acton Baths, Reynolds Sports Centre, a games area on the South Acton Estate's South Park, Twyford Church of England High School and Ealing Tertiary College. In addition the Chiswick Park development has a Health Club and there are numerous private gyms within the Acton area. Acton Baths is currently the subject of consideration of the Town Hall redevelopment proposals. Other community facilities include the Priory Centre, which is a centre used by Somali women and other community groups, the Oak Tree Community Centre, which provides crèche facilities, the Sunlight Nursery and Bollo Brook Youth Centre. SASAC, the South Acton Sewing and Arts Collaborative has been very successful and is operating as a business from a building in the west of the estate.

=== Open space ===
The estate is characterised by a number of large open green spaces forming part of a wider network of green spaces. The most significant of these in terms of ease of access is the generous open space provision at the recreation ground on Bollo Bridge Road, originally a walled Victorian Park but now opened up and framed by mature trees. Tenants and residents on the South Acton estate and wider community have unrestricted access to this space, as well as to Acton Park, Acton Green and Gunnersbury Park. Within the estate the playground on Avenue Road is a well used space and the open space currently used as a football pitch is an important asset for young people. In addition, the recently created South Park involved young people in the creation of a skateboard area but is under used.

=== Education, employment and training ===
There are a number of providers for nursery aged children within the area.

Berrymede Infant School caters for pupils aged 3–7, with pupils aged 7–11 being provided for at the separate Berrymede Junior School, which is located in two buildings located on either side of Osborne Road. The Indices of Deprivation 2004 show that the two schools have the highest deprivation ranking of all 65 primary schools in the Borough. Both schools have had good reports from their last OfSTED inspections and Berrymede Junior has the highest value added score in the Borough in the recently published league tables.

Most secondary age pupils from the area attend one of the three closest high schools (Acton High, Twyford CE High and The Ellen Wilkinson School for Girls). Acton High School has been completely rebuilt and is now in brand new facilities. It is a specialist school for media arts. Education for pupils over the age of 16 is provided via the sixth forms at Twyford and Ellen Wilkinson schools and also the Ealing, Hammersmith and West London College, which has campuses on Ealing Green and in Hammersmith.

=== Bollo Brook Youth Centre ===
The Bollo Brook Youth Centre situated in the center of the estate, is statutory youth centre which specialises in arts based activities . In the youth center there are instruments, a recording studio, cooking lessons and internet access available for South Acton youths. Many teenagers are found here recording music, including UK Garage and Grime popular urban British genres. The centre is also used for daytime programmes with young people who are not in mainstream education, delivered in partnership with other voluntary and statutory sector organisations.

== Crime ==
Historically, crime has been a problem for the South Acton estate and it has attracted a reputation as a dangerous estate, with high levels of drug use and dealing, and other associated anti-social behaviour. The high levels of crime stem from a combination of poor design on parts of the estate that bear some of the features Alice Coleman identified in Utopia on Trial of single entrances with multiple users, as well as complex deck access. It is also a result of a residualised social housing policy that has polarised entrants to social housing into the lowest income categories.

There are a number of drinking control areas on the estate and in Acton itself to tackle alcohol abuse. ASB and drug dealing is also being tackled by the Safer Neighbourhoods Team in partnership with Ealing Council, Ealing Homes and residents.

South Acton's former reputation as dangerous is acutely juxtaposed by its local community which is made up of young and old families who have lived in the area for decades.

== Regeneration ==
As long ago as 1996 the council decided that redevelopment and regeneration was needed on South Acton to improve the quality of homes and of peoples lives. As noted above, lack of investment and poor original design and the high levels of maintenance necessary meant that refurbishment was not the preferred option.

=== Masterplan ===
ECD Architects and Proctor and Matthews were appointed by Ealing Council to prepare an Urban Design Framework, or masterplan, for the regeneration of the South Acton Estate. This framework explores the potential of South Acton and sets markers for what could be achieved if redevelopment was to be pursued.

The framework proposed a mixed development is proposed, including the addition of new housing (public and private), community facilities, non-residential commercial development and retail.

The masterplanners recognised "a real opportunity to create a new high density urban quarter over the next decade, served as it is by Acton Town underground station on the Piccadilly line and South Acton on the north London line." South Acton has a high PTAL rating, meaning that density could be conceivably double from the 2000 units, to near 3500 units.

=== Recent development ===
There have been several phases of development on South Acton since 2001.

==== Phase 1 ====
In 2001 Barrie House, a 21-storey tower block on the centre of the estate was demolished and Phase 1 of the regeneration of South Acton began with the re-development of this site in partnership with Catalyst. The scheme consists of 86 new homes, both social rented and shared ownership and was completed in 2005. In addition six blocks were refurbished internally and externally and the Oak Tree Community Centre (located on Osborne Road) was demolished and new centre (offering approximately twice the floor area) was built in its place. The new community centre opened in August 2007.

==== Phase 2 ====
Phase 2.1 on the site of Maugham Court, Reade Court, Lawrence Court, and Shaw Court Garages will deliver 129 new homes: 75 rented units and 54 shared ownership units, including 13 Wheelchair adapted units. Catalyst successfully gained full planning consent for this phase in November 2007. Construction of the new homes began in May 2008, with an estimated 2 years to complete the building works. Phase 2.2 on the site of Shaw Court and Kipling Tower car park will deliver a further 127 units with a similar split of rented and shared ownership units.

== In popular culture ==
- Episode 1 of the Channel 4 documentary How the Other Half Live featured a family on the South Acton estate.
- Beaumaris Tower, on the South Acton estate, was used for the fictional Nelson Mandela House, the home of Del Boy in the popular sitcom Only Fools and Horses.
- Charles Hocking House is seen at the beginning of Steptoe and Son Series 8 Episode 1 "Back in Fashion"
- Scenes from the 1986 movie Aliens and the 1989 movie Batman were shot inside the disused Acton power station.
- Musician M.I.A in interviews has hinted one of the meanings of her stage name is "Missing in Acton", with Acton being the place she grew up.
- The Who are from Acton.
- The 1994 British drama Ladybird, Ladybird was shot around Acton and was directed by Ken Loach.
- The BBC Three sitcom People Just Do Nothing was filmed on and around the South Acton Estate.
- The final special episode of Channel 4's The IT Crowd shows Douglas Reynholm (Matt Berry) in front of Jerome Tower where he is visiting some youths as part of Secret Millionaire and later goes cruising in the area.
- The miniseries Four Weddings and a Funeral was filmed in one of the new flats in the newly developed estate.
- An episode of the sitcom Stath Lets Flats also made used one of the new flats as in the interior of one of the apartments the title character is trying to rent out.
- An episode of the Idris Elba series Luther was filmed on the South Acton Estate from Barwick House in 2019
- Sky series Gangs of London was filmed on the South Acton Estate in 2020 before the Covid-19 lockdown began
- Professional footballer Robin Friday was brought up on the South Acton Estate. He lived in Barrie House, one of the Tower Blocks

== Neighbouring places ==
- Chiswick
- Gunnersbury
- Ealing
- Park Royal
- Shepherd's Bush

== Gallery ==
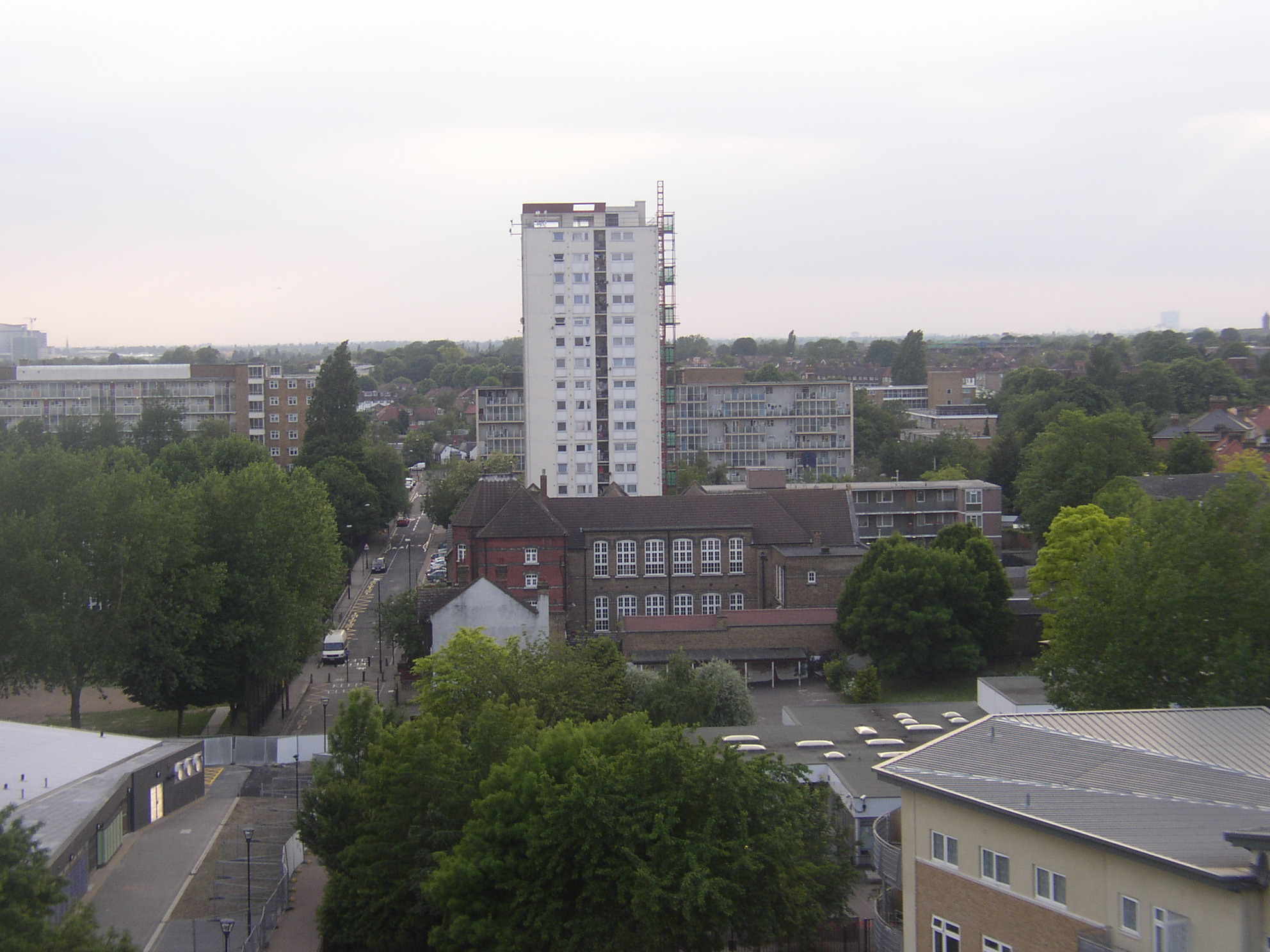
View of South Acton from Barwick House, showing Jerome Tower and Berrymede Junior School

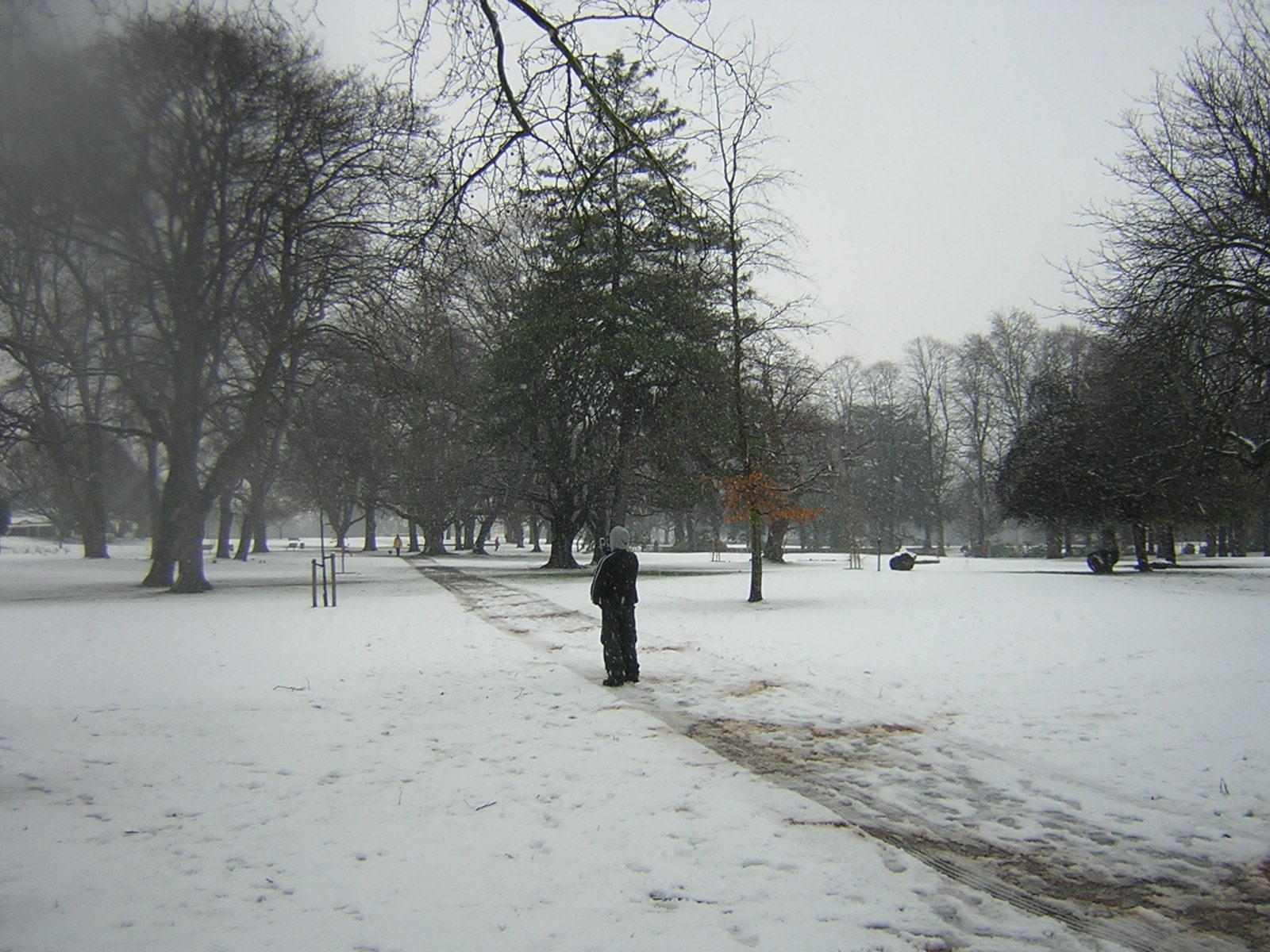
Acton Park

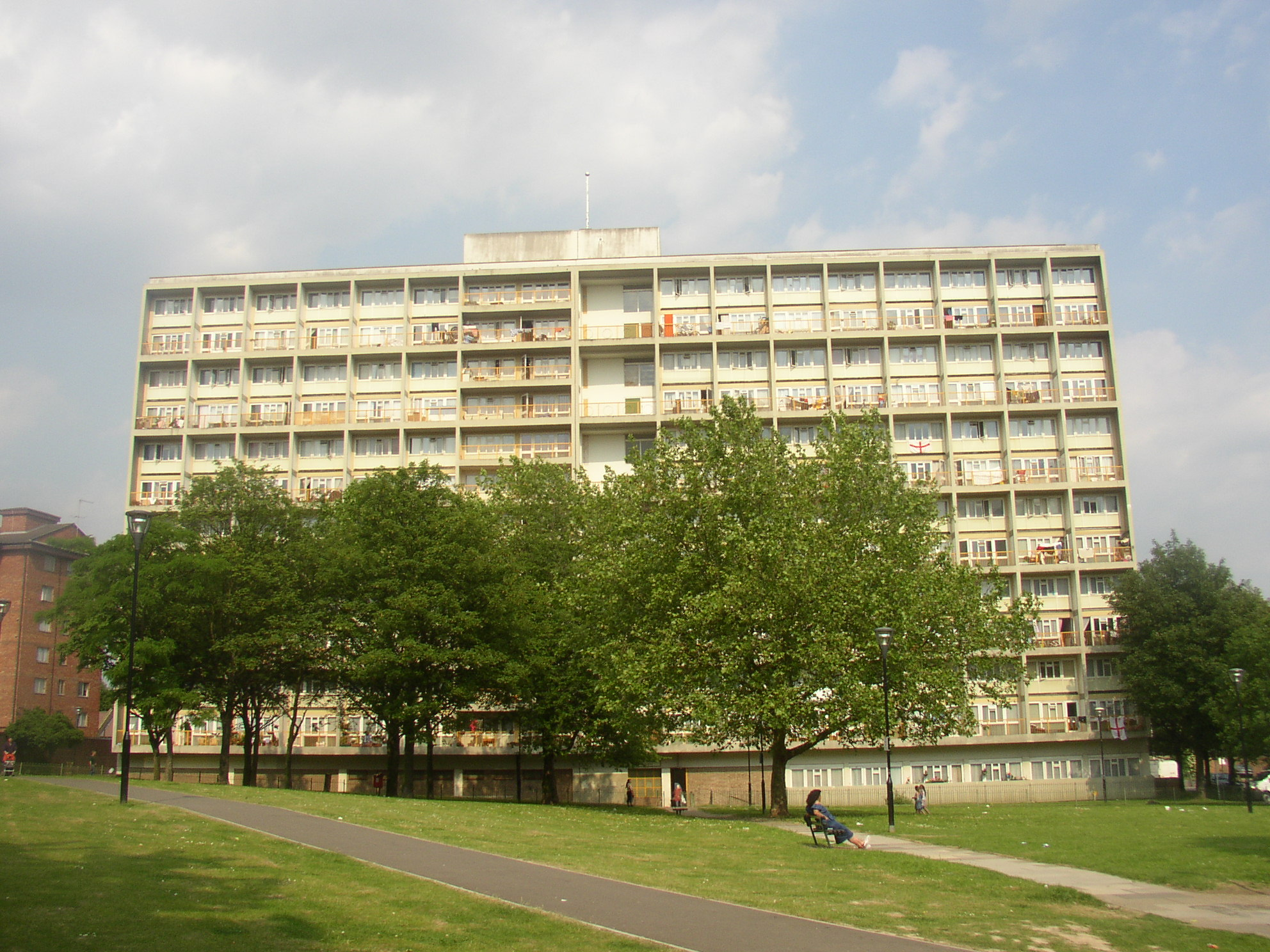
Barwick House, on the South Acton estate

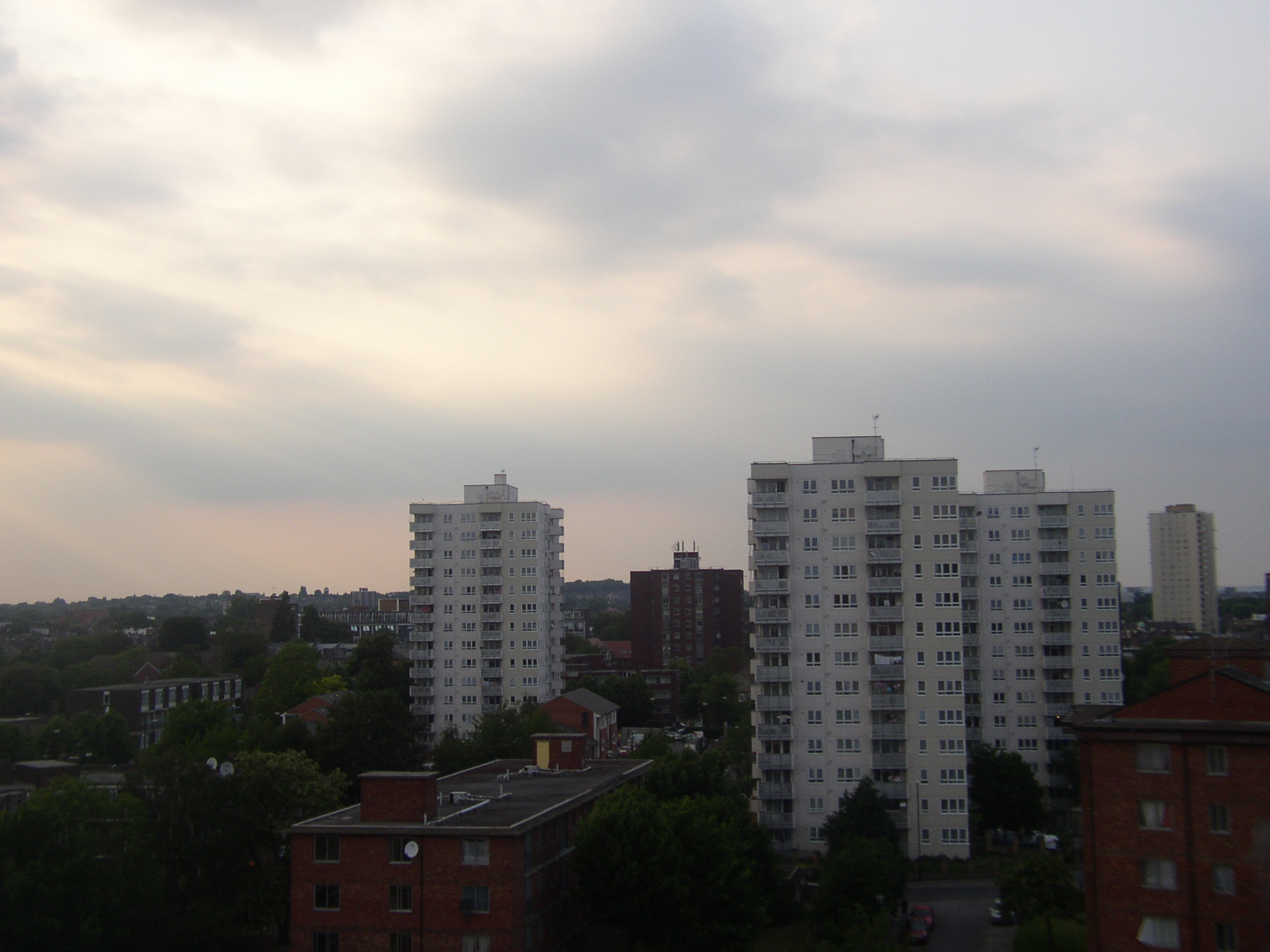
Blocks of flats on the South Acton estate
