= Harry Treadaway =

British actor (born 1984)

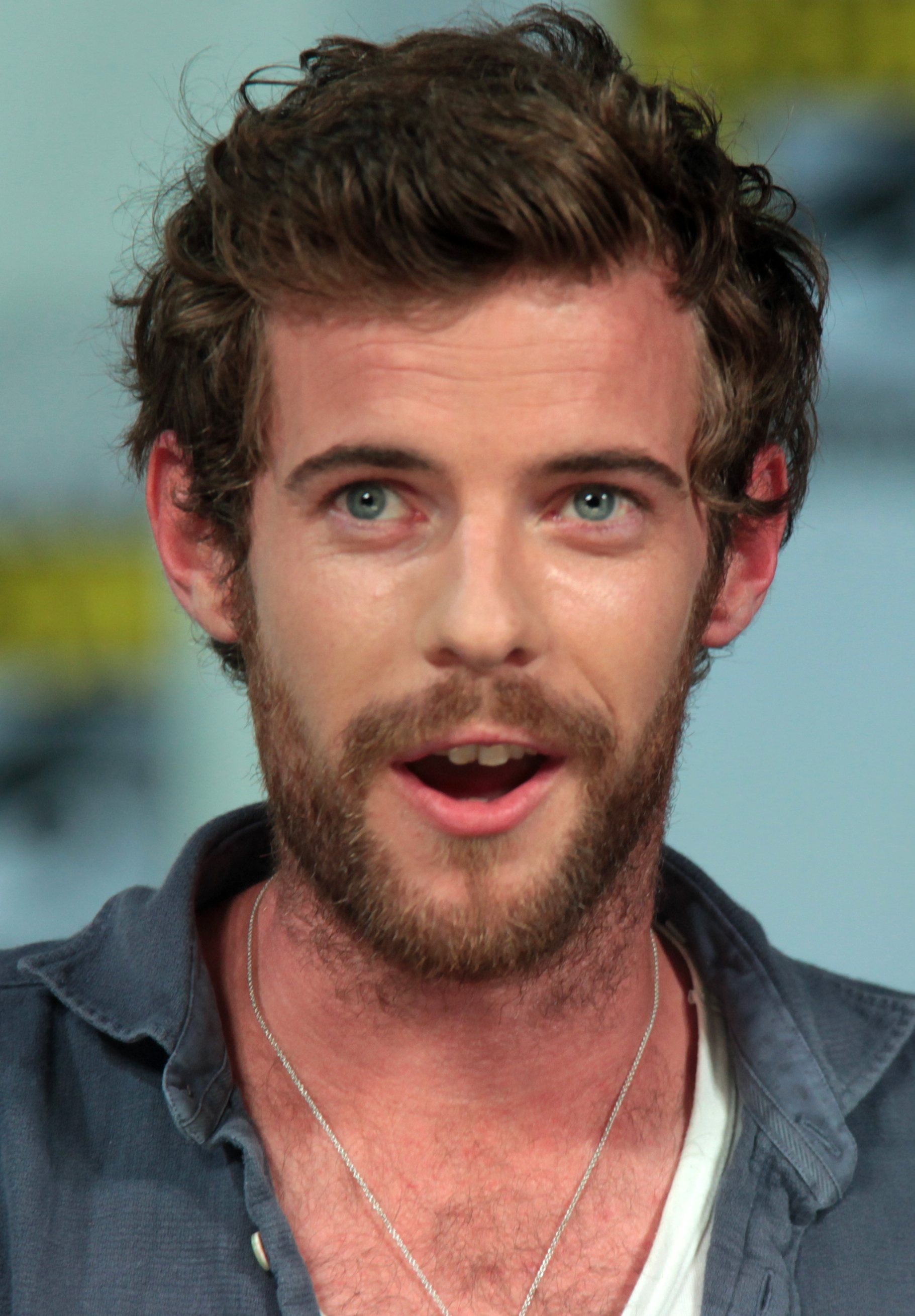
- Treadaway in 2014
- Born: Harry John Newman Treadaway; 10 September 1984 (age 42); Exeter, Devon, England
- Education: LAMDA
- Occupation: Actor
- Years active: 2005–present
- Partner: Holliday Grainger (2015–present)
- Children: 2
- Relatives: Luke Treadaway (twin brother)

Harry John Newman Treadaway (born 10 September 1984) is an English actor. His credits include Control (2007), City of Ember (2008), Fish Tank (2009), Pelican Blood (2010), Flight of the Storks (2012), Mr. Mercedes (2017–2018), The Crown (2019), Star Trek: Picard (2020), Deceit (2021), and The Chemistry of Death (2023). He is the twin brother of actor Luke Treadaway.

== Early life and education ==
Born at the Royal Devon and Exeter Hospital in Exeter, Devon, Treadaway was brought up in Sandford, Devon. His father is an architect and his mother is a primary school teacher. Treadaway attended Queen Elizabeth's Community College in Crediton, Devon, where he played in the twice Devon Cup winning Rugby Union team.

Inspired by a love of Eddie Vedder and with support from their secondary school drama teacher, Harry and his twin brother Luke formed a band called Lizardsun. They also both joined the National Youth Theatre.

Treadaway studied acting at LAMDA and graduated in 2006.

== Career ==
While still at drama school, he had his professional debut in Brothers of the Head, alongside his twin brother Luke Treadaway, a feature film about conjoined twin brothers in a punk rock band. He played Tom Howe, the band's rhythm guitarist and songwriter, and his brother Luke played Barry Howe, the lead singer. The Treadaways performed all tracks featured in the film themselves live on stage, as well as recording nine tracks for the sound-track album.

In 2007, he acted in the Tiger Aspect film Recovery. He starred as Mark Brogan on the Channel 4 series Cape Wrath (known as Meadowlands in the United states). Treadaway played Joy Division drummer Stephen Morris in the film Control (2008). He appeared in the Channel 4 television movie The Shooting of Thomas Hurndall in 2008. In 2009, he starred in the Johnny Kevorkian–directed horror film The Disappeared and the children's science fiction-fantasy film City of Ember. That same year, he made his stage debut in Over There, a play by Mark Ravenhill, alongside his twin brother Luke at the Royal Court Theatre.

In 2011, he starred as title character James Furlong in the Irish film The Last Furlong. In 2014, he played Victor Frankenstein in the Showtime TV series Penny Dreadful. In 2016, he was cast in a leading role in Audience's Mr. Mercedes, based on the Stephen King novel. His part was that of Brady Hartsfield, a brilliant young psychopath who decides to engage in a cat-and-mouse game with Brendan Gleeson's Bill Hodges. Anton Yelchin had originally been given the role of Hartsfield, but following Yelchin's death in June 2016, it was announced that his role had been recast with Treadaway assuming the part. In 2019, Treadaway played Roddy Llewellyn in the third series of Netflix's The Crown. He portrayed the Romulan Narek in the first season of CBS All Access's Star Trek: Picard.

In 2021, he played Detective Inspector Keith Pedder in the Metropolitan Police drama Deceit, about a real-life undercover operation investigating the killing of Rachel Nickell in 1992. In 2024, he played Tom Joad in The Grapes of Wrath at the Royal National Theatre.

== Personal life ==
Treadaway is the twin brother of the actor Luke Treadaway. In 2021, he and his partner Holliday Grainger had twins.

== Filmography ==
=== Film ===
Key
| † | Denotes films that have not yet been released |

| Year | Title | Role | Notes |
|---|---|---|---|
| 2005 | Brothers of the Head | Tom Howe | Nominated—BIFA Most Promising Newcomer |
| 2007 | Control | Stephen Morris | |
| 2008 | City of Ember | Doon Harrow | |
| 2008 | The Disappeared | Matthew Ryan | |
| 2008 | Love You More | Peter | Short film |
| 2009 | Fish Tank | Billy | |
| 2010 | Pelican Blood | Nikko | |
| 2011 | Albatross | Jake | |
| 2011 | Hideaways | James Furlong | |
| 2012 | Cockneys vs Zombies | Andy Macguire | |
| 2013 | The Lone Ranger | Frank | |
| 2014 | Honeymoon | Paul | |
| 2018 | Gringo | Miles | |
| 2026 | Prima Facie | Adam | |
| TBA | Halo of Stars † | Chicci | Post-production |

=== Television ===
Key
| † | Denotes television productions that have not yet been released |

| Year | Title | Role | Notes |
|---|---|---|---|
| 2006 | Afterlife | Liam | Episode: "Roadside Bouquets" |
| 2006 | Agatha Christie's Marple | George Erskine | Episode: "Sleeping Murder" |
| 2007 | Cape Wrath | Mark Brogan | Main cast |
| 2007 | Recovery | Dean Hamilton | TV film |
| 2008 | The Shooting of Thomas Hurndall | Billy | TV film |
| 2011 | The Night Watch | Duncan Pearce | TV film |
| 2012 | Flight of the Storks | Jonathan Anselme | Miniseries, main cast |
| 2013 | Truckers | Glen Davies | Main cast |
| 2014–2016 | Penny Dreadful | Victor Frankenstein | Main cast |
| 2017–2018 | Mr. Mercedes | Brady Hartsfield | Main cast (seasons 1–2) |
| 2019, 2020 | The Crown | Roddy Llewellyn | 2 episodes |
| 2020 | Star Trek: Picard | Narek | Main cast (season 1) |
| 2021 | Deceit | DI Keith Pedder | Miniseries, main cast |
| 2023 | The Chemistry of Death | David Hunter | Main cast |
| TBA | Bishop † | Wyatt | Main cast |

== Awards and nominations ==
| Year | Award | Category | Nominated work | Result | Ref. |
|---|---|---|---|---|---|
| 2006 | British Independent Film Awards | Most Promising Newcomer (shared with Luke Treadaway) | Brothers of the Head | Nominated | |
| 2018 | Satellite Awards | Best Actor in a Television Series – Drama | Mr. Mercedes | Nominated | |
