= Sedaka =

Sedeka is a surname. Notable people with the surname include:

- Alex Sedeka, fictional lawyer in three David Kessler thriller novels
- Dara Sedaka, American musician
- Neil Sedaka (1939–2026), American singer, songwriter and pianist

== See also ==
- Sedaka's Back, 1975 album
- Tzedakah
