= Deceit (2021 miniseries) =

2021 British television series

- Genre: Crime drama Thriller
- Written by: Emilia di Girolamo
- Directed by: Niall MacCormick
- Starring: Niamh Algar; Eddie Marsan; Harry Treadaway; Sion Daniel Young
- Country of origin: United Kingdom
- Original language: English
- No. of series: 1
- No. of episodes: 4

Production
- Producer: Ado Yoshizaki Cassuto
- Cinematography: Jan Jonaeus
- Running time: 48 minutes

Original release
- Network: Channel 4
- Release: 13 August – 3 September 2021

Deceit is a British four-part television drama, based on the true story of a controversial undercover operation carried out by the Metropolitan Police in 1992. Niamh Algar stars as the undercover police officer, codenamed "Lizzie James", who attempts to entrap a suspect in a murder investigation. It premiered on Channel 4 on 13 August 2021, and all subsequent episodes were made available for streaming on All 4 that same day. The series, written by Emilia di Girolamo and produced by Story Films, received critical acclaim.

== Cast ==
- Niamh Algar as Sadie Byrne / Lizzie James
- Sion Daniel Young as Colin Stagg
- Eddie Marsan as Paul Britton
- Harry Treadaway as DI Keith Pedder
- Rochenda Sandall as Lucy
- Nathaniel Martello-White as Baz
- Jack Riddiford as Robert Napper
- Edwin De La Renta as Mark (Kash) Bailey
- Simon Kunz as Sir Harry Ognall

== Production ==
In August 2020, Channel 4 Drama announced they had commissioned a new show with the working title My Name is Lizzie, examining the investigation into the killing of Rachel Nickell in 1992. Later retitled Deceit, the show includes scenes of verbatim dialogue as part of a fictionalised retelling of events.

== Release ==
It was first shown on Channel 4 each week, starting on 13 August 2021. All four episodes were made available on the channel's streaming service All 4 after the first episode was broadcast.

== Episodes ==
No.	Title	Original release date	U.K. viewers (millions)
1	"Episode One"	13 August 2021	N/A
During September 1992, DI Keith Pedder and forensic psychologist Paul Britton plan Operation Edzell, a sting operation against Colin Stagg, after making him the prime suspect due to criminal profiling. Sadie pretends to be Lizzie James and that she is a friend of a former penpal of Stagg's. Stagg believes 'Lizzie', who encourages him to reveal his sexual fantasies to her. Sadie's aim is to try to find out if he is likely to have carried out the sexual assault and stabbing killing of former model Rachel Nickell, a 23-year-old woman, on Wimbledon Common, South London, on 15 July that year.
2	"Episode Two"	20 August 2021	N/A
The police would like to arrest Stagg on suspicion of the murder of Rachel Nickell. He becomes increasingly attracted to 'Lizzie'. The police become aware that the existence of the sting has been leaked, but they do not know how that happened. The investigation team have 'Lizzie' arrange to meet Stagg, which she does as they watch them.
3	"Episode Three"	27 August 2021	N/A
'Lizzie' tells Stagg that she wants the man who killed Rachel Nickell. He tells her that he did not kill her. However, the police arrest him for her murder because he gave details of the position that she was in when found dead, which the media had not released. The pressure 'Lizzie' is under starts to affect her psychologically.
4	"Episode Four"	3 September 2021	N/A
The police's investigation rests on evidence from the controversial honeytrap. In November 1993, whilst Stagg is being held on remand, a young woman and her daughter, Samantha and Jazmine Bisset, are murdered in Plumstead, South London. The police disagree about how similar the Nickell and Bisset killings are. In 1994, the evidence gathered by 'Lizzie' is thrown out of court and the description of the position Nickell was found in is not close to what Stagg said it was. The case against Stagg collapses and he is freed. Sadie Byrne resigns. In 2008, Robert Napper, already serving life sentences for the Bisset murders, is convicted of the manslaughter of Rachel Nickell. Stagg receives £700,000 compensation.

== Reception ==
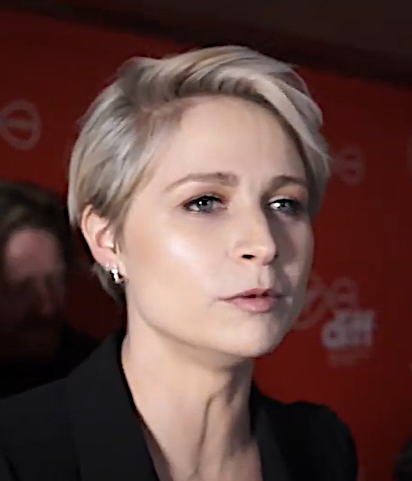
Actress Niamh Algar starred in the series

On the review aggregator website Rotten Tomatoes, the series holds an approval rating of 73% based on 11 critic reviews.

Lucy Mangan, writing for The Guardian, praises Algar's "phenomenal performance" and MacCormick's "magnificent and stylish" direction, and says the only problem the show has is that "it is dealing with events that are stranger than fiction." Sara Wallis from Daily Mirror believes that the miniseries are "not hammer-blow viewing that reconstructs grisly murders" but a more detailed account of the impact of undercover work on Sadie. During the BBC Radio 5 Live program, Algar expressed her opinion of Emilia di Girolamo's work, calling it "something unique" and "one of the most exciting dramas".

Sean O'Grady, writing for The Independent, called Deceit "a gripping portrayal of a real-life undercover operation". For her performance, Algar was nominated for Best Actress at the 2022 British Academy Television Awards.

== See also ==
- The Witness (2026 TV series)
