= David Kessler (author) =

English author

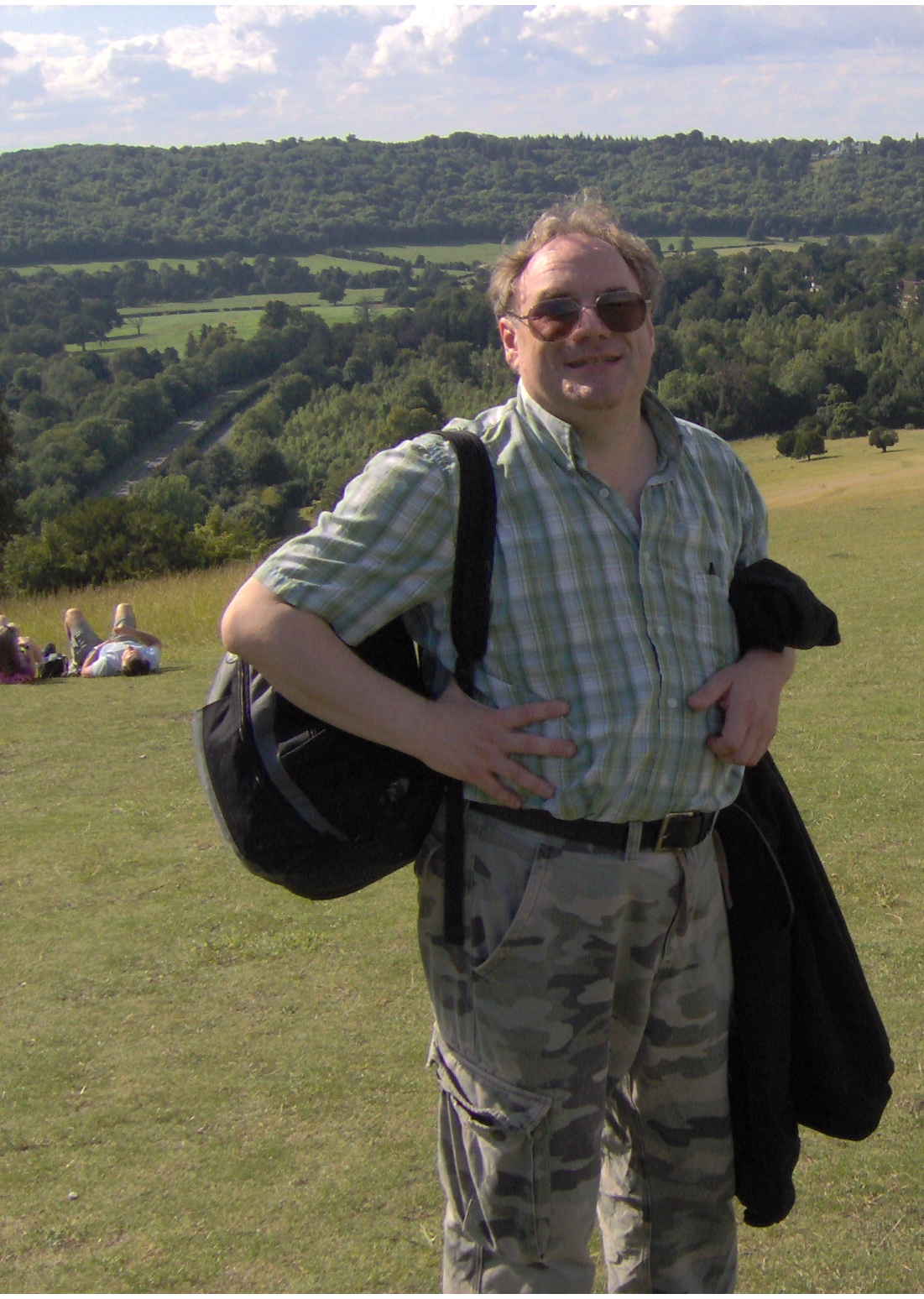
- Born: London, England
- Occupation: Author
- Writing career
- Period: 1997—present
- Genres: Mystery, Thriller

David Kessler (born 1 April 1958) is an English author of mystery novels and thrillers. The plots of his novels often involve people falsely accused of crimes, legal battles, DNA, computer hacking and police investigations and are characterised by multiple plot twists and last-minute surprises. With the exception of A Fool for a Client, his early novels (published by Hodder Headline) were set in Britain. His new series of books (published by HarperCollins) is set in the Bay Area of California and centres on a series of recurring characters including the lawyer Alex Sedaka and his paralegal Juanita Cortez. His latest series, published under the pseudonym "Adam Palmer", introduces the character of Daniel Klein, an expert on ancient Semitic languages.

== Background ==
Kessler was born to a Jewish family in London, England, and dropped out of school at the age of 15. Shortly thereafter, he wrote a screenplay that he showed to his mother's cousin, movie director Clive Donner. Although never produced, the screenplay made Kessler realise that he wanted to become a writer.

== Career ==
Kessler began writing at the age of 15 when he dropped out of school, but it wasn't until he was in his late thirties that he secured a publishing contract from Hodder Headline. His first book A Fool for a Client was a legal thriller and courtroom drama about the trial of a 23-year-old female medical student in New York for the murder of an Irish nationalist who had fled to the United States and avoided extradition. The title is an allusion to the legal aphorism that anyone who conducts their own defense "has a fool for a client". In the novel, the accused, Justine Levy, insists on conducting her own defence despite judicial advice to the contrary. The book was reviewed by Susanna Yager in the Sunday Telegraph, who wrote: "The author has thought up the most ingenious method of committing murder that I have come across in a long time". The book dealt with a number of political themes, including the funding of the IRA by front organizations allegedly helping the families of imprisoned IRA members.

This was followed by The Other Victim about the stabbing of a teenager and the disappearance of a billionaire in what turn out to be linked cases. The London Sunday Express wrote of this book: "The pace is fast, characters convince and the plot is well thought out. Kessler writes well."

However after his next two books, Tarnished Heroes and Reckless Justice, he was dropped by Hodder during a slump in publishing. At that same time, he courted controversy by co-writing a book about the murder of Rachel Nickell called Who Really Killed Rachel? with Colin Stagg the man who had been falsely accused of the murder and who at the time was still perceived by some to have been a guilty man who got away with the crime. The book—which was published in 1999 by small publisher Greenzone, after the major publishers turned it down—named Robert Napper as one of four credible suspects. Nine years later, Napper pleaded guilty to manslaughter due to diminished responsibility for the crime, after new DNA technology and other innovations in forensic science linked him to the crime. Kessler wrote an ebook The Wimbledon Common Murder updating his earlier work on the subject.

Kessler made a comeback in 2009 when he signed a three book deal with the Avon division of HarperCollins UK for a series of books about a San Francisco lawyer, Alex Sedaka. Prior to that, an unpublished version of Mercy, the first book in the series, appeared on the Authonomy website (owned by HarperCollins). However, it was not picked up by HarperCollins through Autonomy. Rather it was sent to HarperCollins by Kessler's agent and picked up through the conventional channels.

Mercy is about Sedaka's race against time to save a client on death row after the client declines an offer of clemency from the governor. The entire book takes place in a 15-hour time-frame and was described by James O'Brien (radio presenter) on LBC as "a cracking thriller".

No Way Out is about Sedaka's defence of a black neoconservative talk show host (and former black power activist) on a charge of raping a white girl in a cause celebre that has America bitterly divided.

2011 marked a change of direction for Kessler with a new book, The Moses Legacy, a combination of conspiracy, historical and chase thriller about an expert on Semitic languages (Daniel Klein) who is called in to translate a sample of Proto-Sinaitic script found on the shattered remnants of ancient stones found in the Sinai desert by a female archaeologist. Kessler – who lists Dan Brown as one of his influences (see below) – adopted the pen-name Adam Palmer to signify the change of style and genre. Kessler has also written and published eBooks in other genres such as science fiction, children's literature and chick-lit.

== Influences ==
Kessler cites Harlan Coben, Ayn Rand, Sidney Sheldon and Dan Brown as his influences. However, he also admitted that the inspiration for Mercy came from a conversation with a psychiatric nurse with whom he got talking when he called the wrong number while trying to contact an old friend.

== Politics ==
Kessler is a staunch Zionist and has campaigned tirelessly against disinformation about Israel and Zionism on social media platforms, including Wikipedia.

== Identity theft ==
On 12 February 2024, Kessler contacted a literary agent with a view to restarting his writing career, after several years of inactivity. Four days later, a fraudster created a website using the same name as Kessler's old website (davidkesslerauthor.com), plagiarised some text from Kessler's old website (available via the WayBackmachine), and inserted some additional text falsely implying that Kessler was interested in, and approved of, online gambling.

The fraudster also posted a hotlink on the appropriated website to a monetised gambling website (lightning-dice-game.com) which contained similarly misleading text. The fraudster posted pictures of an unknown male (not Kessler) on both sites, as well as links to the real David Kessler's LinkedIn profile.

Kessler wrote to the hosts of both the fake David Kessler website (Gname.com Pte. Ltd.) and the gambling website (Super Privacy Service LTD c/o Dynadot) notifying them of the dishonest actions, but they refused to take any action.

== Novels ==
| Year | Title | ISBN | Comments |
|---|---|---|---|
| 1997 | A Fool for a Client | ISBN 0-340-68899-8 | Available as an eBook. |
| 1997 | The Other Victim | ISBN 0-340-68902-1 | Available as an eBook. |
| 1998 | Tarnished Heroes | ISBN 0-340-70835-2 | Currently out of print. |
| 1999 | Reckless Justice | ISBN 0-340-70837-9 | Currently out of print. |
| 1999 | Who Really Killed Rachel | ISBN 0-9582027-2-9 | Currently out of print. |
| 2009 | Mercy | ISBN 1-84756-182-9 | First Alex Sedaka thriller. |
| 2010 | No Way Out | ISBN 1-84756-183-7 | Second Alex Sedaka thriller. |
| 2011 | The Moses Legacy [as "Adam Palmer"] | ISBN 1-84756-184-5 | First Daniel Klein thriller. |
| 2011 | Ethan and the Devious Doctor [as "Dan Ryan"] | eBook | Children's book. |
| 2011 | Ethan and the Cryptic Clues [as "Dan Ryan"] | eBook | Children's book. |
| 2011 | The Year of Compulsory Childbirth [as "Nigel Farringdon"] | eBook | Science fiction. |
| 2011 | Spirit of Icarus [as "Nigel Farringdon"] | eBook | Science fiction. |
| 2011 | Hidden Menace | eBook | The Dovi Shamir adventures. |
| 2011 | Checkmate at the Beauty Pageant | eBook | The Dovi Shamir adventures. |
| 2011 | The Wimbledon Common Murder | eBook | Update on Who Really Killed Rachel. |
| 2011 | The Luddite Girls [as Karen Dee] | eBook | Chick-lit. |
| 2012 | Hello darkness my old friend [formerly Marked Man] | eBook | Third Alex Sedaka thriller. |
| 2012 | The Boudicca Parchments [as "Adam Palmer"] | eBook | Second Daniel Klein thriller. |
| 2015 | How to write an Amazon fiction book that SELLS | eBook | Non-fiction. |
