= Chiswick Park tube station =

London Underground station

Chiswick Park
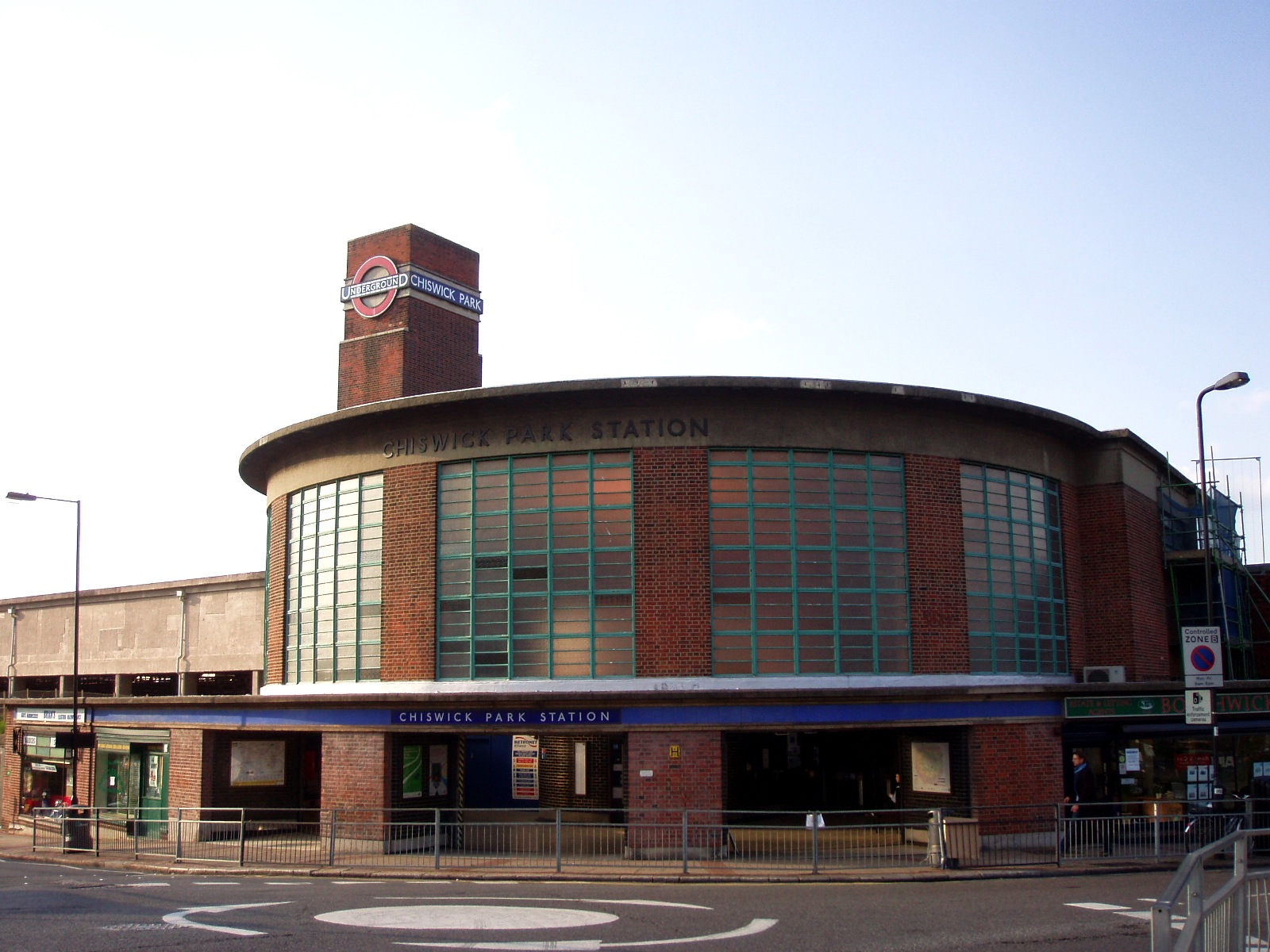
- Station entrance
- Interactive map of Chiswick Park

General information
- Location: Chiswick
- Local authority: London Borough of Ealing
- Managed by: London Underground
- Number of platforms: 2
- Fare zone: 3

London Underground annual entry and exit
- 2020: ▼1.07 million
- 2021: ▼1.01 million
- 2022: ▲1.90 million
- 2023: ▲2.07 million
- 2024: ▲2.19 million

Railway companies
- Original company: District Railway

Key dates
- 1 July 1879: Opened as Acton Green
- March 1887: Renamed Chiswick Park & Acton Green
- 1 March 1910: Renamed Chiswick Park

Listed status
- Listing grade: II
- Entry number: 1358798
- Added to list: 18 February 1987; 39 years ago

Other information
- External links: TfL station info page
- Coordinates: 51.49472°N 0.26778°W

Chiswick Park (/ˈtʃɪzɪk ˈpɑːrk/) is a London Underground station in the Acton Green district of Chiswick in West London. It is on the Ealing Broadway branch of the District line, between Acton Town and Turnham Green stations. It is located at the junction of Bollo Lane and Acton Lane about 150 m north of Chiswick High Road (A315) and is in London fare zone 3. The station is near Acton Green common. The Piccadilly line uses the inside tracks, but, as there are no platforms on these tracks, their trains cannot stop here.

== Location ==
Chiswick Park station is closer to Turnham Green (on the south side of Chiswick High Road) than the station of that name.

The station is located on the site of the Battle of Turnham Green (1642), during the First English Civil War. The Royalist lines, facing London, extended southward from the station to where the Great West Road now runs.

Immediately to the south of the station entrance, on the other side of the road junction, the tracks of the District line's Richmond branch cross under the road and about 100 m to the east of the station, the eastbound track crosses under the four District and Piccadilly line tracks on its way towards Turnham Green station.

The Gunnersbury Triangle nature reserve, run by the London Wildlife Trust, is a short walk from the station entrance.

== History ==
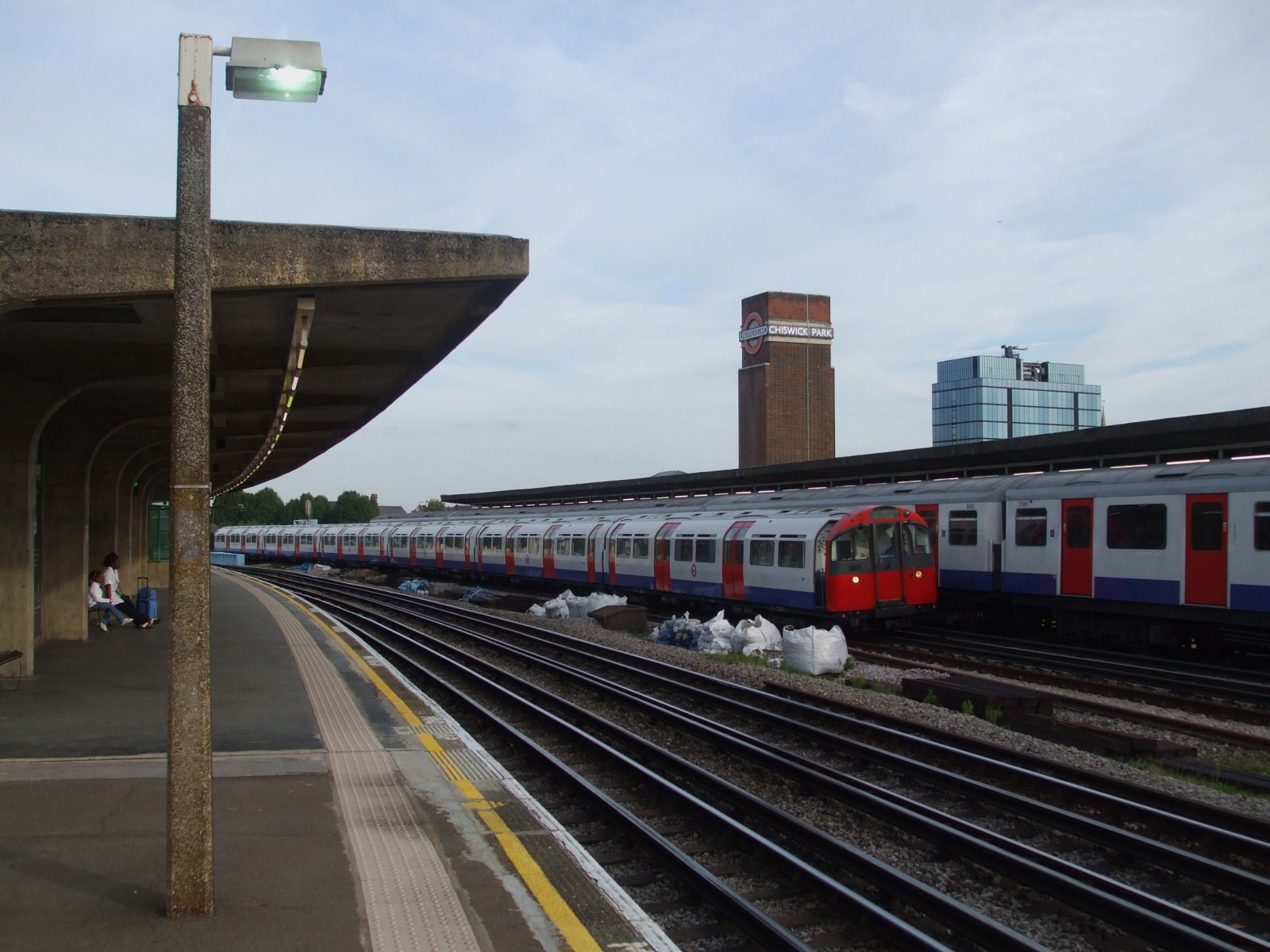
A westbound Piccadilly line train overtakes a District line train calling at Chiswick Park

The station was opened on 1 July 1879 by the District Railway (DR, now the District line) on its extension from Turnham Green to Ealing Broadway. The station was originally named Acton Green after the adjacent Acton Green Common to the east. It was renamed to Chiswick Park and Acton Green in March 1887.

Following the electrification of the DR's tracks north of Acton Town in 1903, services between Acton Town and central London were electrified on 1 July 1905. In 1910 the station was given its present name.

Between 1931 and 1932 the station was rebuilt, in preparation for the western extension of the Piccadilly line from Hammersmith. Although the Piccadilly line has never served the station, its trains run non-stop through the station on the centre tracks, and the reconstruction was required to enable the addition of two fast tracks for those services to be located between the District line's stopping service tracks.

The new station was designed by Charles Holden in a modern European style using brick, reinforced concrete and glass. Holden's design was inspired by Alfred Grenander's underground station Krumme Lanke in Berlin. Similar to the station at Arnos Grove that Holden designed for the eastern Piccadilly line extension, Chiswick Park station features a tall semi-circular ticket hall adjacent to the embankment carrying the tracks. Externally the brick walls of the ticket hall are punctuated with panels of clerestory windows and the structure is capped with a flat concrete slab roof which abuts the cantilevered concrete canopy of the westbound platform. A similar canopy shelters the eastbound platform accessed through the embankment. To make the station's location visible from Chiswick High Road the station was also provided with a square brick tower surmounted by the UNDERGROUND roundel and the station's name.

The station has been a Grade II listed building since 18 February 1987.

| Preceding station | London Underground | Following station |
|---|---|---|
| Acton Town towards Ealing Broadway | District line Ealing Broadway branch | Turnham Green towards Upminster or High Street Kensington |
