= Murder of Penny Bell =

1991 murder in London, England

Penny Bell
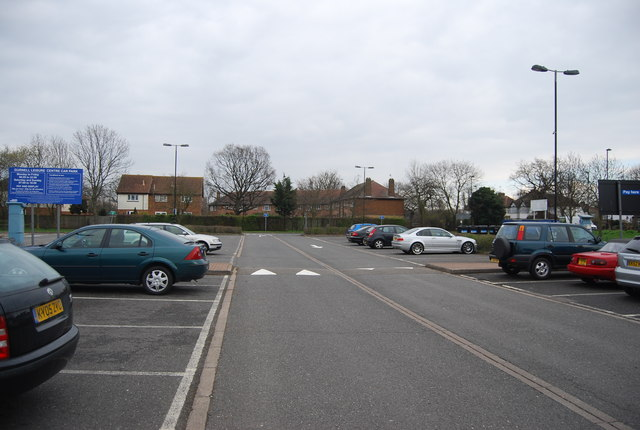
- The car park at Gurnell Leisure Centre in 2012.
- Born: Ruth Penelope Bell; 28 February 1948; Burnham on Sea, Somerset, England
- Died: 6 June 1991 (aged 43); Gurnell Leisure Centre, Perivale, Greenford, London, England
- Cause of death: Homicide by stabbing
- Occupation: Company Director

Locations
1 09:50 Unidentified man enters blue Jaguar car on the Fulmer Common Road.
2 Shortly before 11:00 suspicious man crossing footbridge appearing to be wet and in shorts.
3 11:00 Bell found dead in her blue Jaguar car in Gurnell Leisure Centre car park.
4 Suspicious unspecified vehicle reported by eyewitness as tailgating them from the leisure centre overtakes at speed on Cuckoo Avenue.

Ruth Penelope "Penny" Bell (28 February 1948 – 6 June 1991) was an English businesswoman who was murdered on 6 June 1991 in the car park of Gurnell Leisure Centre, Greenford, London. She was stabbed over fifty times as she sat behind the wheel of her car. Her murder remains unsolved.

== Background ==
Penny Bell lived with her husband, Alistair Bell, in Baker's Wood, near Denham, Buckinghamshire where they moved in October 1987. Penny was a partner in Coverstaff Ltd, a successful employment agency based in Kilburn.

Bell was the mother to two children, Matthew (born c.1978) and Lauren (born 1982).

The family home was undergoing extensive renovations from November 1990, valued at £100,000. Penny had withdrawn £8,500 from her and her husband's joint bank account on 3 June 1991, three days before her death. She had never previously withdrawn such a large sum of cash and it remains unaccounted for. At the police press conference on 8 June 1991, Alistair Bell described Penny as having something on her mind the night before her death, that she fell asleep while watching the television news at 9 pm and went to bed early.

== Murder ==
On the morning of 6 June 1991, Alistair Bell left the house as usual at 8:30 BST. He described his wife's demeanour as "bright and chirpy". He noted that Penny did not wave him off as he left with their son in his car, as was her usual custom, but believed that this was due to the disruption caused by their kitchen renovation.

Bell left her home in her arctic blue Jaguar XJS at around 9:40 BST, which was her usual leaving time. She informed the builders, who were renovating the kitchen, that she was running late for an appointment. No record of this appointment was later found in her diary or other papers, and it has never been conclusively established whom she was meeting. It has been suggested that she could have been collecting someone from the railway station, as a train arrived at the station at 9:50. An electrician, who was the last known person to speak to Bell, described her demeanour as "normal and casual".

A witness saw a man waiting by a brown or bronze coloured car get into a blue Jaguar XJS about 9:50 am on the Fulmer Common Road opposite the Bridgettine Convent and Guest House adjacent to Black Park. The witness, who was walking her dog, was sure the driver of the Jaguar was Bell. The man getting in was described as white, about 5' 10" tall and aged about 48.

Another witness next recalled a blue Jaguar XJS driving along Greenford Road at about 10:20 BST at 10–15 mph with its hazard lights flashing. A third witness came forward six months after the murder and claimed he saw Bell driving into the car park with a passenger, and mouthing an appeal for help, which he ignored.

It is believed that Bell was murdered around 10:30 BST. She was seen motionless in the driver's seat of her car in the Gurnell Leisure Centre car park at 11:00 BST, but the passers-by who witnessed her body assumed she was sleeping. It wasn't until 12:15 BST when the police were alerted and her body was discovered. She had been stabbed more than fifty times in the chest and arms with a three to four-inch blade, in what police were to describe as a "frenzied" attack. A forensic investigation determined that the killer had stabbed her from the passenger seat before exiting the car and frantically stabbing her from the driver's side.

== Investigation ==
At the time, the Gurnell leisure centre had been busy, and the 153-space car park almost full. Poor visibility and audibility aided the killer; the car was parked in front of a high hedge perimeter, which blocked the view from the front. Wallpaper samples for the proposed decoration of Penny and Alistair's bedroom were found laid out in the centre console of the car. They had been posted by Laura Ashley to the Bells' home on 24 April and had not been shown by Penny to anyone until the morning of the murder six weeks later.

Police believed the killer would have been heavily bloodstained following the murder, but no witnesses came forward to say they saw anyone covered in blood at or near the scene. A witness, Patricia Parry, did see a car leaving the Gurnell car park at speed and being driven erratically around the time of the murder. It followed her along Ruislip Road East and into Cuckoo Avenue, where it overtook her.

The police investigation determined that Bell was a happily married and successful businesswoman and could find no reason why anyone would want to kill her. Police believed that it was very likely that Bell knew her killer but have struggled to ascertain a motive. The police did not believe that robbery was the motive, and Bell's handbag remained in the car untouched and there was no evidence of sexual assault. The frenzied nature of the attack, however, suggested a personal motive.

4,000 people had been questioned by the police by May 1992.

Alistair and Bell's business partner, Michael Flynn, offered a £20,000 reward for evidence leading to a conviction.

== Potential suspects ==
Lauren Bell believes that her mother knew her killer, as "the ferocity of the attack suggests a crime of passion ... I think it was someone who wanted her but couldn't have her."

A former neighbour of the Bell family from when they lived in Whitmore Road in Harrow before moving to Baker's Wood in 1987, John Richmond, was arrested by the police in April 1992 after he sold a story to The Sun newspaper in which he admitted being the man Bell had been with on the morning of her death. Richmond also claimed to have been in a secret relationship with Bell at the time. His fingerprints were then found in Bell's car. He was eventually released from police bail in July 1992 after the Crown Prosecution Service decided not to charge him. The police investigation was then wound up, with Richmond being described as "completely in the clear". Police interviewed Richmond again in December 1994, after he claimed Bell was killed by an "assassin" and that he had been paid £30,000 by the man behind the murder to keep quiet. He claimed he knew the identity of the murderer because he was asked to recommend a hitman to carry out a knife attack, but didn't know Bell was the victim.

Police had also examined Bell's husband Alistair as a suspect, as he inherited the bulk of his wife's estate as well as a £200,000 life insurance payout. However, they found no evidence to link him to his wife's murder and he had a verified alibi of being at work in Shaftesbury Avenue in Harrow on the morning of 6 June 1991.

Bell had worked as a Samaritan until around 1982, and police explored the idea that the killer was someone she had counselled but this line of inquiry did not identify any further suspects.

In 2003, police were performing forensic DNA analysis on blood stains found at the crime scene.

Robert Napper was interviewed in 2008 following his conviction for the 1992 murder of Rachel Nickell, but there was no evidence linking him to Bell's murder, and he was cleared of involvement.

== Thirtieth anniversary appeal and reward ==
Lauren Bell announced in January 2021 that she was again offering a £20,000 reward for information that would solve her mother's murder in its thirtieth anniversary year. An Instagram account was set up to share information and updates about the case. The case was featured on the BBC's Crimewatch Live programme on 10 March 2021.

== See also ==
- List of unsolved murders in the United Kingdom
- Murder of Alison Shaughnessy – another unsolved case of a woman stabbed to death in London three days prior to Bell's murder
- Murder of Deborah Linsley – another high-profile unsolved murder in London
