= Acton Town tube station =

London Underground station

Acton Town
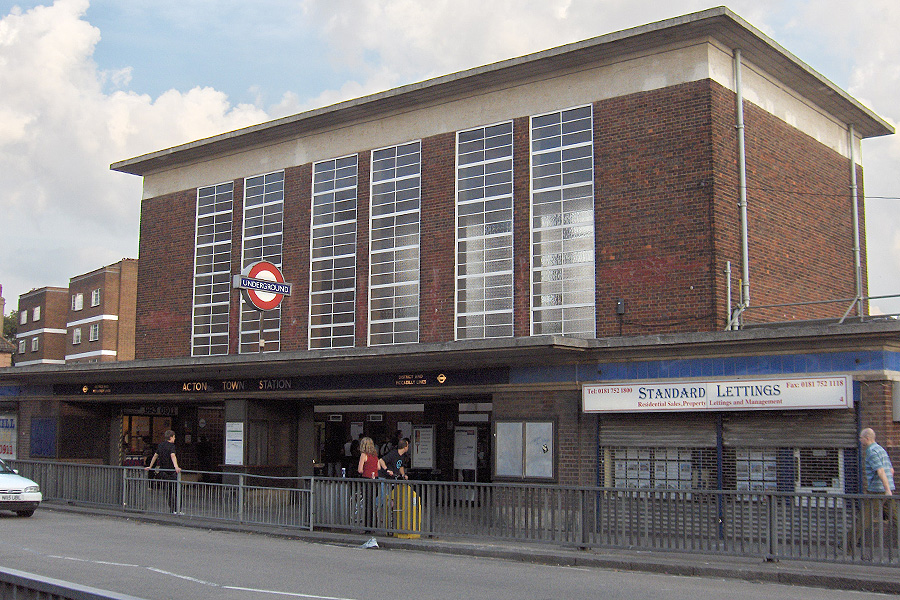
- Station entrance
- Interactive map of Acton Town

General information
- Location: Acton
- Local authority: London Borough of Ealing
- Managed by: London Underground
- Number of platforms: 4
- Accessible: Yes (Note: Page 1: Acton Town – Lift access between street and platform)
- Fare zone: 3

London Underground annual entry and exit
- 2021: ▼2.90 million
- 2022: ▲4.93 million
- 2023: ▼4.82 million
- 2024: ▲4.85 million
- 2025: ▼4.61 million

Railway companies
- Original company: District Railway

Key dates
- 1 July 1879: Opened as Mill Hill Park on the line to Ealing Broadway
- 1 March 1910: Renamed Acton Town
- 4 July 1932: Piccadilly line services commenced

Listed status
- Listing grade: II
- Entry number: 1263471
- Added to list: 17 May 1994; 32 years ago

Other information
- External links: TfL station info page
- Coordinates: 51.50278°N 0.28000°W

Acton Town is a London Underground station in Acton, West London, in the London Borough of Ealing, close to its boundary with the London Borough of Hounslow. The station is served by the District and Piccadilly lines, and is in London fare zone 3. On the Ealing Broadway branch of the District line, the station is between Ealing Common and Chiswick Park stations. On the Piccadilly line, it is between Ealing Common (on the Uxbridge branch) or South Ealing (on the Heathrow branch) and Hammersmith (or Turnham Green in the early mornings and late evenings) stations.

Acton Town station was opened as Mill Hill Park on 1 July 1879 by the District Railway (now the District line). It remained as a terminus until on 1 May 1883 and 23 June 1903 the District Railway opened two branches from Acton Town to Hounslow Town and Park Royal & Twyford Abbey respectively. On 4 July 1932 the Piccadilly line was extended to Acton Town. District line services to both the Hounslow and Uxbridge branches were withdrawn completely on 9 and 10 October 1964 after which operations were provided by the Piccadilly line alone.

The original brick-built station was built in 1879 and in February 1910 the station building was reconstructed. On 1 March 1910 the station was given its present name. In 1931 and 1932 the station was rebuilt again in preparation for transferring the Uxbridge branch service from the District line to the Piccadilly line. The new station was designed by Charles Holden in a modern European geometric style using brick, reinforced concrete and glass.

== Location ==
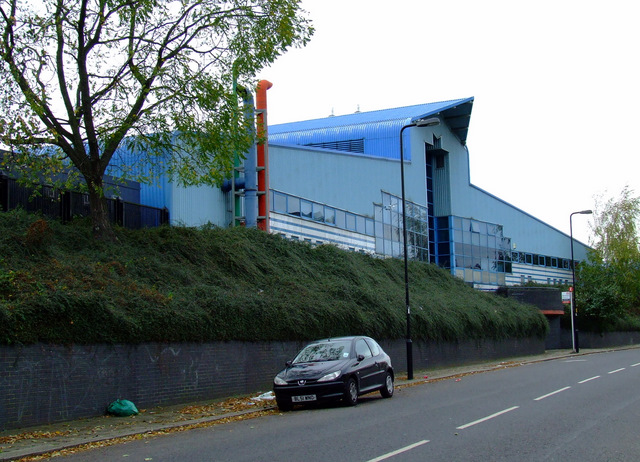
Frank Pick House near the station, on Gunnersbury Lane

The station is at the junction of Gunnersbury Lane (A4000) and Bollo Lane. To the south-west of the station is the former Acton Works, central overhaul and engineering works for the London Underground. It is now home to the London Transport Museum's reserve collection of rail and road vehicles (as known as London Transport Museum Depot or Museum Depot). While primarily serving as the museum's official storage facility, the depot is equipped with amenities for visitors, and is open to the public on a number of weekends throughout the year. To the north of the station is the District line's Ealing Common Depot.

Frank Pick House was near the station, on Gunnersbury Lane. Named after Frank Pick, the London Passenger Transport Board's chief executive from 1933 to 1940, it was home to one of the engineering departments of the London Underground, the building was demolished in 2026 to allow for future housing development.

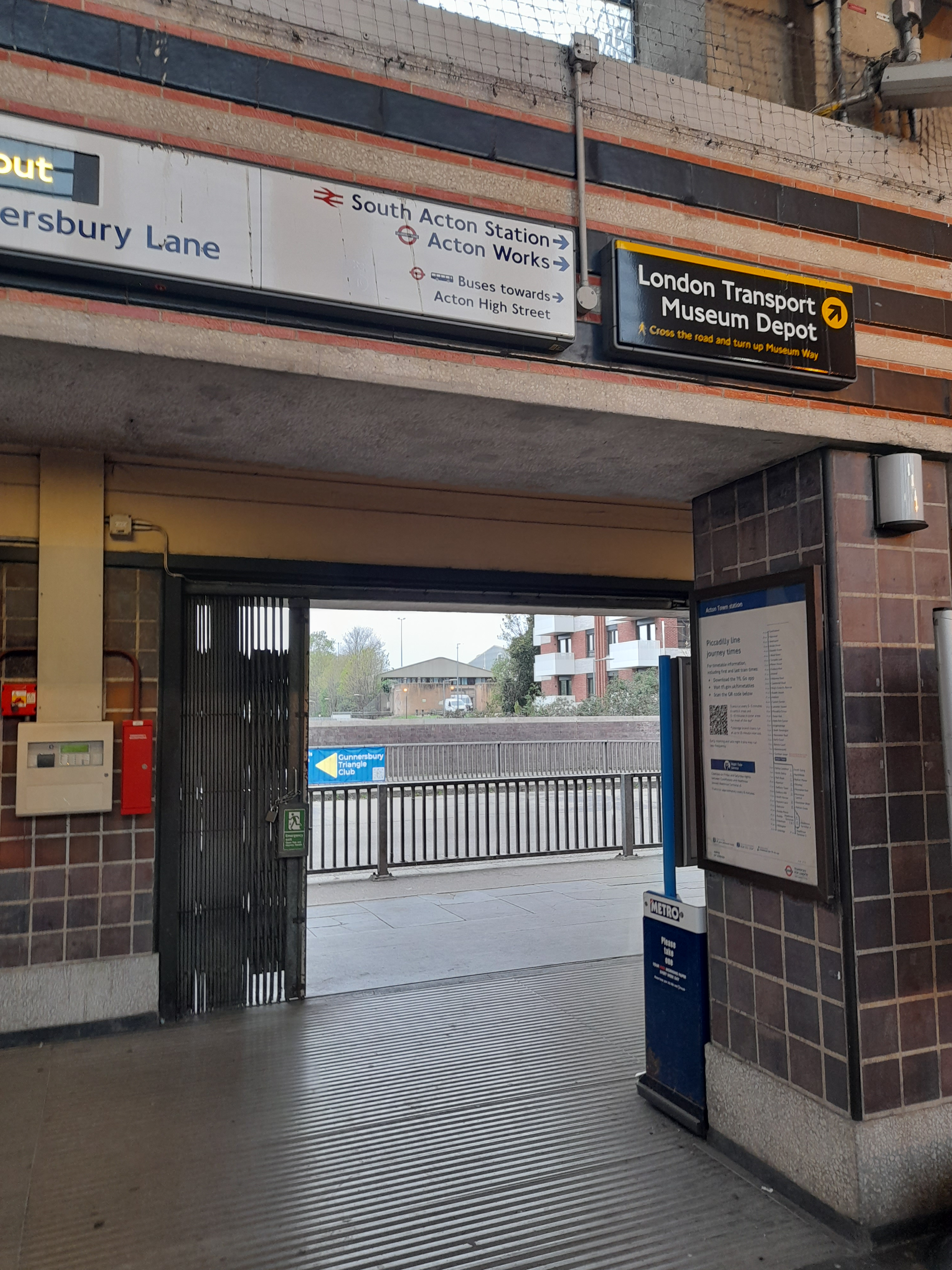
Acton Town station exit looking towards the London Transport Museum's store buildings

== History ==
=== District line ===
==== Hounslow and Uxbridge branches ====
Acton Town station was opened as Mill Hill Park on 1 July 1879 by the District Railway (now the District line) on its extension from Turnham Green to Ealing Broadway. On 1 May 1883 the District Railway opened a branch from Acton Town to the now defunct Hounslow Town station, which developed into the Heathrow branch. On 23 June 1903 the District Railway tracks extended north of Acton Town to a new station at Park Royal & Twyford Abbey which became the first of the Underground's surface lines to use electric traction instead of steam with the Acton Town – Ealing Common section also electrified. The existing deep tube lines, (City and South London Railway, Waterloo & City Railway (now Waterloo & City line) and Central London Railway) had always been electrically powered. Services on the Hounslow branch (now the Heathrow branch) and to Central London were electrified on 13 June 1905 and 1 July 1905 respectively.

==== South Acton branch ====
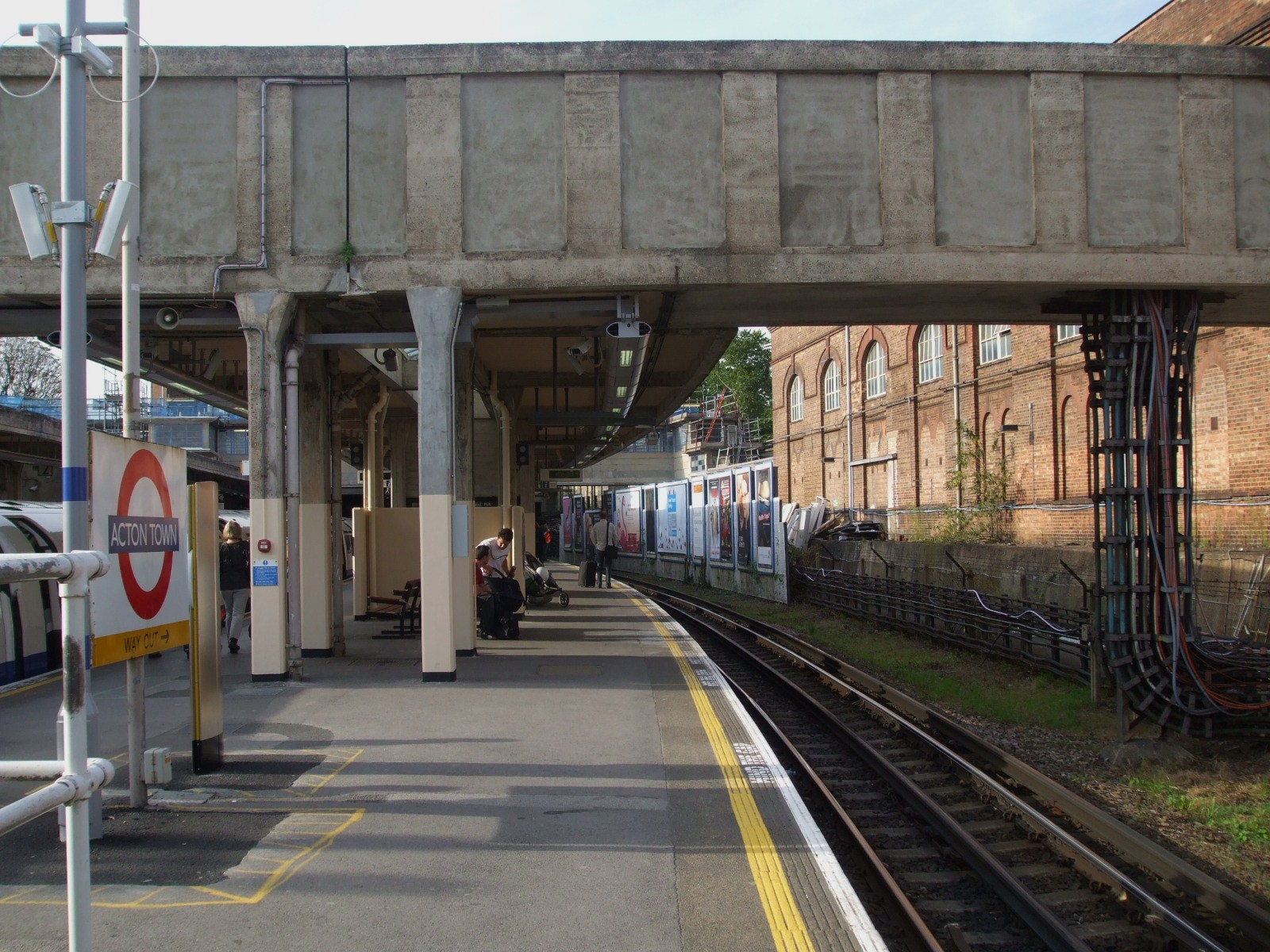
Eastbound District line platform looking west with the remains of the branch on the right

On 13 June 1905, a passenger service began on the short branch to South Acton. A short fifth platform for the single car train of the South Acton branch was provided to the north of the eastbound island platform. At first the service ran to Hounslow West and to Uxbridge but it was later reduced to a shuttle between Acton Town and South Acton on 15 February 1932. (Note: The branch was also known as the "There and back while the kettle boils" branch because of the short distance and quick turnaround at South Acton.) The South Acton branch was closed on 28 February 1959 due to low usage; its platform at Acton Town has not been removed and is still visible. Some of the branch remains. A bridge support on the south side of Bollo Lane was removed in 2026. In the picture, the area behind the hoarding in the background is the location of the former branch platform (Platform 5) which was only ever very short, two carriages at most. Part of a dismantled bridge where the shuttle crossed Bollo Lane near the entrance to Acton Works was demolished in 2026.

=== Piccadilly line ===
On 4 July 1932, the Piccadilly line was extended west from its original terminus at Hammersmith and shared the route with the District line to Ealing Common. From Ealing Common to South Harrow, the District line was replaced by the Piccadilly line, and from that date, District line trains from Acton Town ran only either to Hounslow West or to Ealing Broadway. On 9 January 1933 Piccadilly line trains, sharing with the District line, began serving Northfields on the Hounslow branch, and their service was extended to Hounslow West on 13 March 1933 but Piccadilly line trains did not call at South Ealing until 1935. District line services on the Hounslow branch were withdrawn on 9 and 10 October 1964 after which operations were provided by the Piccadilly line alone.

== Station building ==
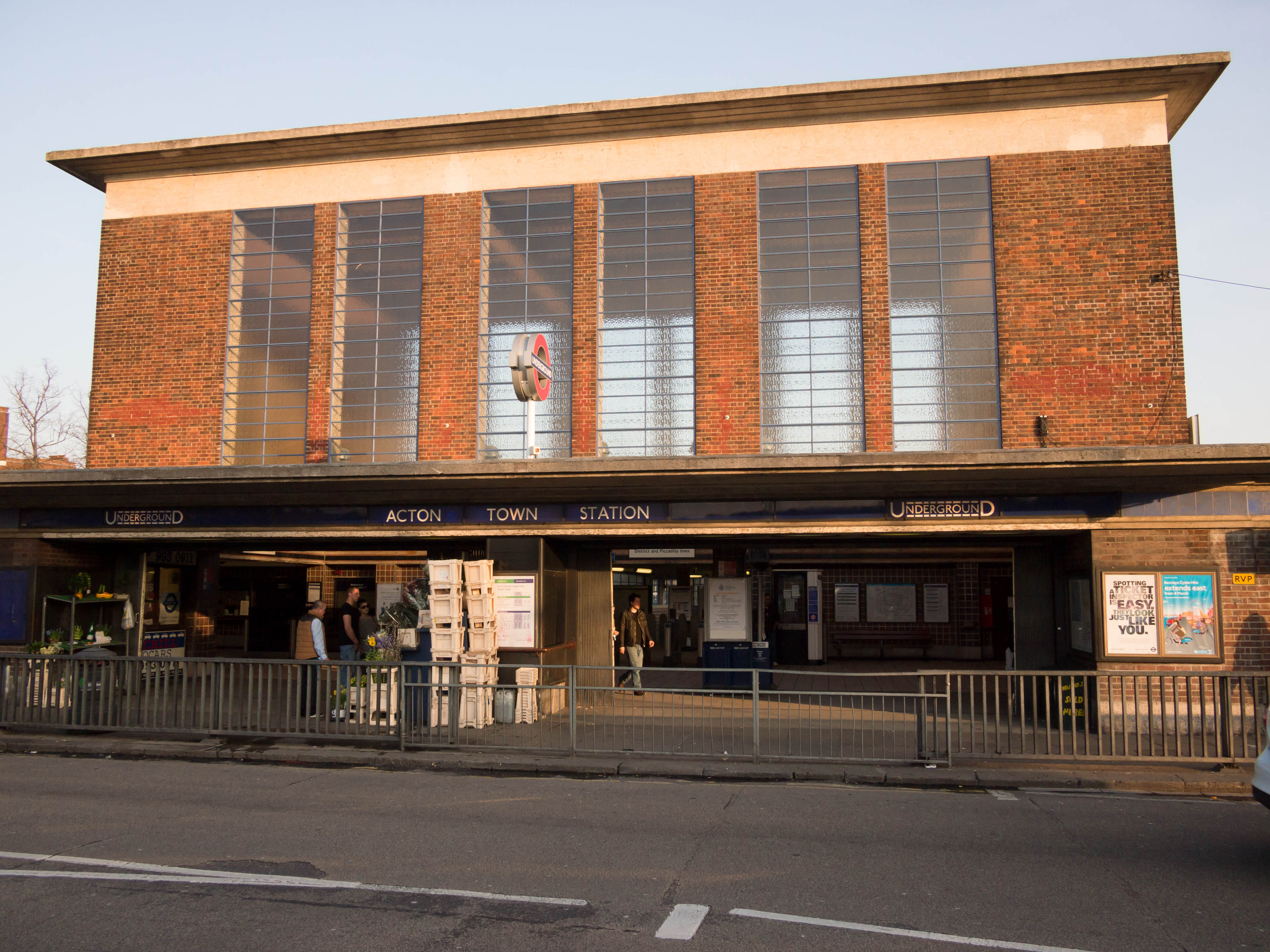
Front view of the station. Note the London Underground Roundel sign mounted on the flat canopy.

The original brick-built station was built in 1879. In February 1910 the station building was reconstructed and on 1 March 1910 the station was given its present name. In 1931 and 1932 the station was rebuilt again in preparation for transferring the Uxbridge branch service from the District line to the Piccadilly line. The new station was designed by Charles Holden in a modern European geometric style using brick, reinforced concrete and glass.

As with other stations that Holden designed, (Note: Sudbury Town, the first station to be rebuilt in 1931, formed a template for many of the other new stations that followed, including Acton Town: a tall rectangular brick box with a flat concrete slab roof and panels of vertical glazing to allow light into the interior. Holden called them his "brick boxes with concrete lids". The Sudbury Town pattern was reproduced with adaptations at Alperton, Eastcote, Northfields, Oakwood, Rayners Lane, Sudbury Hill and Turnpike Lane. However, Alperton station is not a listed building.) Acton Town station features a tall block-like ticket hall rising above a low horizontal structure housing the station offices and shops. The ticket hall has a projecting London Underground roundel sign over a canopy, the brick walls of the ticket hall are punctuated with panels of clerestory windows and the structure is capped with a flat concrete slab roof. From the ticket hall enclosed stairs descend to the platforms under integral concrete canopies on paired piers in alternating broad and narrow bay formation. A part of the narrow bays is infilled by kiosks, integral poster boards, roundel signs and fixed seating. The platforms are linked by a secondary bridge at the southern end. Reinforced concrete platform canopies replaced the original timber canopies. Since 17 May 1994, the station has been a Grade II Listed building.

The stated reason for why it should be listed was:

Reinforced concrete post and lintel construction with red brick infill, some load-bearing. Symmetrical almost square and double-height ticket hall flanked by kiosks on bridge, from which parade of shops descends to Bollo Lane with secondary entrance under stepped boxed lighting to the rear. Ticket hall gives on to complex access area with open frame construction, whence enclosed stairs descend to platforms under integral concrete. canopies - incorporating clerestory - on paired piers in alternating broad and narrow bay formation. The narrow bays part infilled by kiosks, integral poster boards, roundel signs and fixed seating. The platforms are linked by a secondary bridge at the southern end. All the frontage shops have their original bronzed glazing, particularly elaborate in the taller frontages to Bollo Lane and in the side passage. All shopdoors original save that to single shop east of station. The station windows metal with strong horizontal emphasis in their glazing bars. Ticket hall has projecting roundel sign over canopy, and three double-height paired windows to street frontage with similar windows at upper level to rear. Exposed concrete frame to ceiling, rendered upper walls with brown tiling below. Original tiled floors. Included as an important example of Holden's mature work for an interchange station.

== Services ==
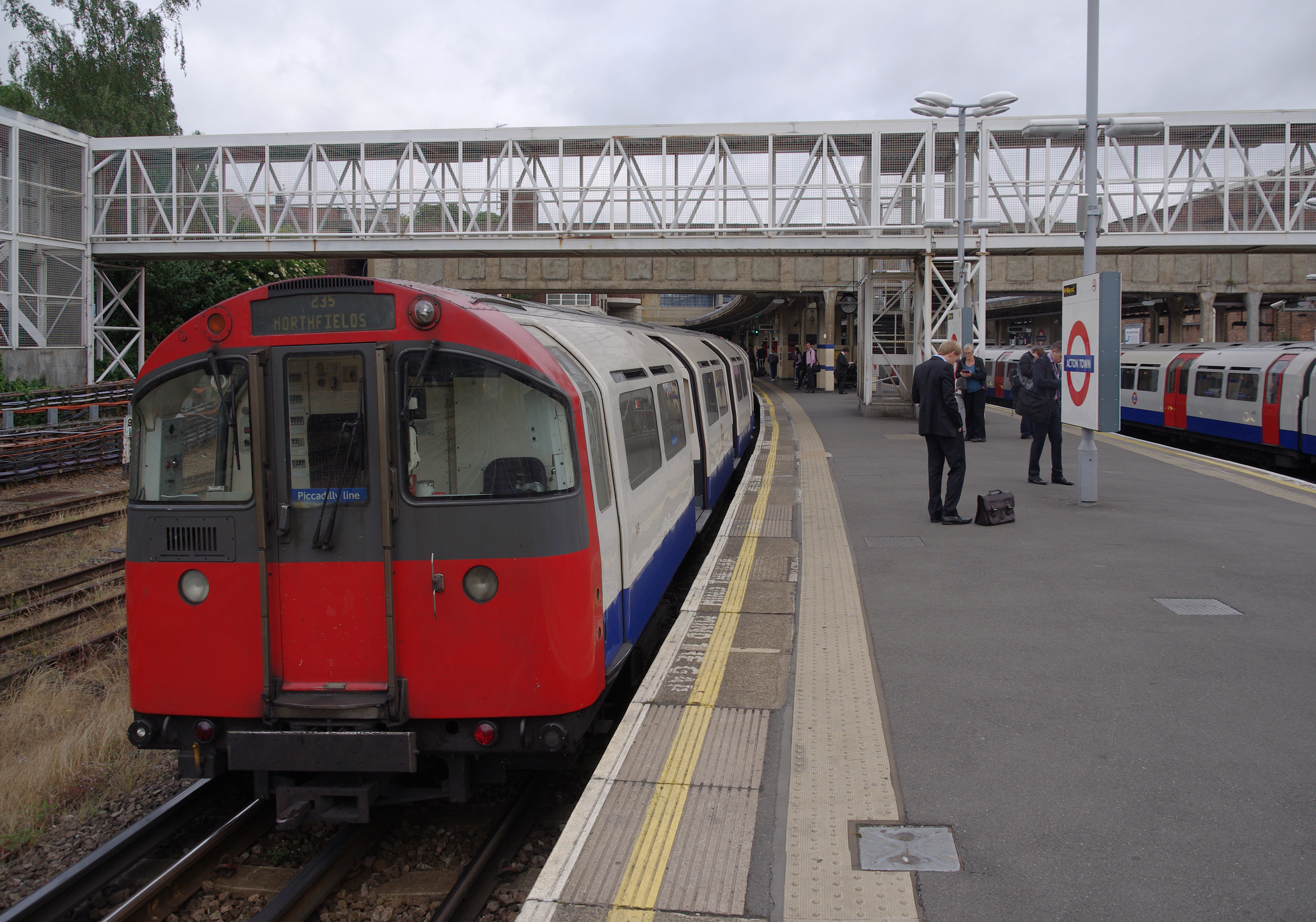
A Piccadilly line train stands on a westbound platform at Acton Town looking west.

Acton Town station is on the District and Piccadilly lines in London fare zone 3. Between Acton Town and Hammersmith, District line trains serve all stations, but Piccadilly line trains run non-stop to Hammersmith except for calling at Turnham Green at the start and end of the day. The run between Acton Town and Hammersmith spans nearly three miles – the longest distance between stops on the Piccadilly line. West of Acton Town, District line trains go via Ealing Common to Ealing Broadway and Piccadilly line trains run either via South Ealing to Heathrow, or via Ealing Common to Uxbridge.

=== District line ===
On the Ealing Broadway branch of the District line, Acton Town station is between Ealing Common to the west and Chiswick Park to the east.

The typical off-peak service is:

- 6 trains per hour eastbound to Upminster (Barking on Sundays)
- 6 trains per hour westbound to Ealing Broadway

There is also a morning service every day from Acton Town (Ealing Broadway on Saturdays) to Edgware Road and a late evening service from Edgware Road to Ealing Broadway on Sundays only.

=== Piccadilly line ===
On the Piccadilly line, Acton Town station is between Ealing Common (on the Uxbridge branch) or South Ealing (on the Heathrow branch) to the west and Hammersmith (or Turnham Green during the early mornings and late evenings) to the east.

Train frequencies vary throughout the day, but generally operate every 2–5 minutes eastbound, Off-peak services include 3 trains per hour (tph) to Uxbridge and 3 tph to Rayners Lane. At peak times there are 6 tph to Uxbridge and 6 tph to Rayners Lane, and every 2–7 minutes westbound to Heathrow Terminal 2 & 3 and Terminal 5 or via the Heathrow Terminal 4 loop. Since 16 December 2016, Acton Town is also served by Night Tube trains between Cockfosters and Heathrow Terminal 5.

During occasional closures on the District line, the Piccadilly line provides additional services to serve destinations on the District line such as Ealing Broadway. This is done either by diverting some trains bound for Rayners Lane and Uxbridge, or as a shuttle from Acton Town. Also, Piccadilly line trains may also run on the District line tracks between Hammersmith and Acton Town to serve the District line stations with no platforms on the Piccadilly line, namely Ravenscourt Park, Stamford Brook, Turnham Green and Chiswick Park. (Note: Ravenscourt Park has four platforms, two platforms for each line but the Piccadilly line platforms are rarely used. Stamford Brook has three platforms, one island and one side platform. The island platform is used by westbound District and Piccadilly line services while the side platform is used by eastbound District line services only. Note that the Piccadilly line platform is also not frequently used. Piccadilly line services call at Turnham Green in the early mornings and late evenings only.)

Preceding station	London Underground	Following station
Ealing Common towards Ealing Broadway	District line Ealing Broadway branch	Chiswick Park towards Upminster, High Street Kensington or Edgware Road
Ealing Common towards Uxbridge or Rayners Lane	Piccadilly line Uxbridge branch	Turnham Green Early morning and late evening service only towards Cockfosters or Arnos Grove
Ealing Common towards Uxbridge or Rayners Lane	Piccadilly line Uxbridge branch	Hammersmith towards Cockfosters or Arnos Grove
South Ealing towards Heathrow Airport (Terminal 4 or Terminal 5)	Piccadilly line Heathrow branch	Turnham Green Early morning and late evening service only towards Cockfosters or Arnos Grove
South Ealing towards Heathrow Airport (Terminal 4 or Terminal 5)	Piccadilly line Heathrow branch	Hammersmith towards Cockfosters or Arnos Grove
Preceding station	London Underground	Following station
Terminus	District line South Acton branch (1905–1959)	South Acton Terminus
South Ealing towards Hounslow Town or Hounslow West	District line Hounslow branch (1883–1964)	Chiswick Park towards Upminster or High Street Kensington

== Connections ==
Day and nighttime London Buses routes serve the station.

== Incidents ==
On 25 March 1993, Jean Bradley was stabbed to death shortly after leaving Acton Town tube station. As of 2022, the murder remains unsolved.

On 1 February 2022, a large fire occurred at the Autocar Centre, a garage adjacent to the now-abandoned platform 5 is, which subsequently caused the evacuation of the station and "severe delays" to the District line and Piccadilly line. Ten fire engines and 70 firefighters were sent to the scene after being called at 5:10 pm, and stayed there until late at night, bringing the fire under control.

== Bibliography ==
- Butt, R.V.J. (1995). The Directory of Railway Stations. Patrick Stephens Ltd. ISBN 1-85260-508-1.
- Day, John R.; Reed, John (2008) [1963]. The Story of London's Underground (10th ed.). Harrow: Capital Transport. ISBN 978-1-85414-316-7.
- Glinert, Ed (2012). The London Compendium. Penguin UK. ISBN 978-0-71819-203-7.
- Greathead, James Henry (1896). "The City and South London Railway". with some Remarks Upon Subaqueous Tunnelling by Shield and Compressed Air. With an abstract of the discussion upon the paper. London: The Institution of Civil Engineers.
- Jowett, A. (2000). Jowett's Nationalised Railway Atlas. Atlantic Publishing. ISBN 0-906899-99-0.
- Orsini, Fiona (2010). Underground Journeys: Charles Holden's designs for London Transport (PDF). V&A + RIBA Architecture Partnership. Archived from the original (PDF) on 14 March 2012.
