= Robert Napper =

English serial killer and rapist

- Born: Robert Clive Napper; 25 February 1966 (age 60); Erith, London, England
- Other names: The Green Chain Rapist; The Plumstead Ripper
- Height: 6 ft 2 in (1.88 m)
- Penalty: Indefinite detention in a psychiatric hospital

Details
- Victims: 3
- Span of crimes: 15 July 1992 – November 1993
- Country: United Kingdom
- Date apprehended: May 1994

Robert Clive Napper (born 25 February 1966) is an English serial killer and rapist. He has been convicted of two murders, one manslaughter, two rapes and two attempted rapes. He was sentenced to indefinite detention at Broadmoor Hospital on 18 December 2008 for the manslaughter of Rachel Nickell on 15 July 1992. He was previously convicted of the 1993 double murder of Samantha Bisset and her daughter Jazmine Bisset.

Napper has been diagnosed with paranoid schizophrenia as well as Asperger syndrome (now known as autism spectrum disorder).

== Early life ==
Robert Napper is the eldest child of Brian Napper, a driving instructor, and his wife, Pauline. Born in Erith, southeast London, Napper was brought up in nearby Abbey Wood. His background was troubled and dysfunctional. The marriage of his parents was violent and Napper witnessed his father abusing his mother. His parents divorced when he was nine and he and his siblings (two brothers and a sister) were placed in foster care and underwent psychiatric treatment for six years at the Maudsley Hospital in Camberwell.

Napper was socially awkward at school, where he was shunned by his peers, who later described Napper as being "despised". At age 13 Napper underwent a personality change after a family friend sexually assaulted him on a camping holiday. The offender was jailed, but Napper became obsessively tidy and reclusive, according to his mother. He also bullied his siblings and spied on his sister while she was naked.

== Criminal activities ==
In 1986, Napper first came to police attention after being convicted of an offence with an airgun. In October 1989, police had rejected information conveyed in a phone call from Napper's mother that her son had admitted to committing a rape on Plumstead Common. No case apparently matched the evidence. However, it emerged at the time of Napper's second conviction, that the rape of a 30-year-old woman, in front of her children, eight weeks earlier, had been reported to have occurred in a house that backed onto Plumstead Common. At this point, Pauline Napper broke off all contact with her son.

On 15 July 1992 on Wimbledon Common Napper stabbed 23-year-old mother Rachel Nickell 49 times in front of her son, Alex, then aged two. Napper was questioned about unsolved attacks on other women during the year but was eliminated from inquiries.

In November 1993, in the Bisset home in Plumstead, Napper stabbed 27-year-old Samantha Bisset in her neck and chest, killing her, and then sexually assaulted and smothered her four-year-old daughter, Jazmine Jemima Bisset. In her sitting room Napper mutilated Samantha Bisset's body, taking away body parts as a trophy. The crime scene was reportedly so grisly that the police photographer assigned to the case was forced to take two years' leave after witnessing it.

After a fingerprint belonging to Napper was recovered from Samantha's flat he was arrested by DS Alan Jackaman and charged with the murders of Samantha and Jazmine Bisset, in May 1994. Jackaman later also identified him as a suspect in the investigation into Nickell's murder. Napper was convicted at the Old Bailey in October 1995. He also admitted two rapes and two attempted rapes at this time. From the time of the first Old Bailey trial he has been held at Broadmoor. In December 1995 he was questioned about Nickell's death but denied any involvement.

Napper is also believed to have committed most or all of the attacks attributed to the "Green Chain Rapist" (named after the Green Chain Walk, a string of leafy pathways linking large parts of southeast London), who carried out at least 70 savage attacks across south-east London over a four-year period ending in 1994. The earliest of the Green Chain rapes have been linked to Napper and were those he admitted to in 1995. Napper is known to have kept detailed records of the sites of potential and actual attacks on women. During the investigation into the rapes, Napper had been eliminated due to his 6 ft 2 in (1.88 m) height, as detectives had decided to exclude anyone over 6 ft 0 in (1.83 m) based on the description of a 5 ft 7 in (1.70 m) rapist. However there are conflicting witness reports of the rapist's height and Napper walked with a stoop.

The investigation to find Nickell's murderer resulted in the attempted prosecution of an innocent man, Colin Stagg, until, in 2004, advances in DNA profiling revealed Napper's connection to the case. On 18 December 2008 Napper was convicted of the manslaughter of Nickell on the grounds of diminished responsibility. He also admitted to four other attacks on women. Napper was sentenced to indefinite detention at Broadmoor Hospital. In his summing up at the Old Bailey Mr Justice Griffiths Williams said to Napper: "You are in any view a very dangerous man."

== Depictions in popular culture ==
Napper was portrayed by Jack Riddiford in the 2021 miniseries Deceit, which retold the story of Operation Edzell.

The murder of Rachel Nickell was dramatised in Netflix’s drama The Witness (2026).

== See also ==
- Murder of Penny Bell – unsolved 1991 murder in London that was once linked to Napper
- Murder of Alison Shaughnessy – 1991 murder in London that was once linked to Nickell's
- Batman rapist – unidentified UK serial rapist who has eluded capture since 1991
- House for sale rapist – unidentified UK serial rapist who has eluded capture since 1979; suspected to have been John Cannan, who is the prime suspect in the disappearance of estate agent Suzy Lamplugh
