= Killing of Rachel Nickell =

1992 murder on Wimbledon Common, London, England

Rachel Nickell
- Born: Rachel Jane Nickell; 23 November 1968
- Died: 15 July 1992 (aged 23); Wimbledon Common, London, England
- Cause of death: Stab wounds
- Children: 1

Rachel Jane Nickell (23 November 1968 – 15 July 1992) was a British woman who was stabbed to death on Wimbledon Common in southwest London on 15 July 1992. The initial police investigation of the crime resulted in the arrest in controversial circumstances of an innocent man, who was acquitted.

Nickell was walking with her two-year-old son on Wimbledon Common when she was stabbed 49 times in the neck and torso and died at the scene. A lengthy police investigation to find the perpetrator followed, during which a suspect was wrongfully charged and later acquitted—before the case went cold.

The detectives involved in arresting the innocent man had rejected, with "hostility", a suggestion from detectives investigating the November 1993 murders of single mother Samantha Bisset and her four-year-old daughter, Jazmine, as having been perpetrated by the same suspect due to similarities in the crimes. In 2006, a cold case investigation did identify Robert Napper – the man caught and convicted in 1995 for the Bisset murders – as Nickell's murderer. In 2008, Napper pleaded guilty to Nickell's manslaughter on the grounds of diminished responsibility. Napper, who was already detained at high-security Broadmoor Hospital in Berkshire for the Bisset murders, was ordered to be detained there indefinitely.

== Killing ==
At the time of her death, Nickell was aged 23 and lived near Wimbledon Common with partner André Hanscombe and their two-year-old son, Alexander Louis. On the morning of 15 July 1992, she and Alexander were walking their dog on Wimbledon Common. While passing through a secluded area, Nickell was repeatedly stabbed and sexually assaulted. Alexander was physically unharmed, and was found by a passer-by clinging to Nickell's body, repeating the words "Wake up, Mummy", having placed a piece of paper on her forehead as a makeshift bandage.

== Investigation ==
Officers of the Metropolitan Police undertook the investigation, under pressure to find the perpetrator by press coverage and public outrage at the circumstances of the murder. Thirty-two men were questioned in connection with the killing, and the investigation quickly targeted Colin Stagg, a man from Roehampton who was known to walk his dog on the Common. As there was no forensic evidence linking him to the scene, the police asked Paul Britton, a criminal psychologist, to create an offender profile of the killer. They decided that Stagg matched the profile and asked the psychologist to assist with designing a covert operation, code-named Operation Edzell, to see whether he would eliminate or implicate himself. This operation was later criticised by the media and the trial judge as effectively a "honeytrap".

=== Operation Edzell ===
An undercover policewoman from the Metropolitan Police Special Operations Group (SO10) contacted Stagg, posing as a friend of a woman with whom he used to be in contact via a lonely hearts' column. Over five months, she attempted to obtain information from him by feigning a romantic interest, meeting him, speaking to him on the telephone and exchanging letters containing sexual fantasies. During a meeting in Hyde Park, they spoke about the Nickell homicide; he later said that he had only played along with the topic because he wanted to pursue the romance. Profiler Paul Britton later said that he disagreed with use of the fantasy-filled letters and knew nothing of them until after they had been sent.

The undercover officer won Stagg's confidence and drew out fantasies from him that psychologist Paul Britton interpreted as "violent", but he did not admit to the killing. Police released a taped conversation between the police officer and him, in which she claimed to enjoy hurting people, to which he mumbled, "Please explain, as I live a quiet life. If I have disappointed you, please don't dump me. Nothing like this has happened to me before". When she went on to say, "If only you had done the Wimbledon Common murder, if only you had killed her, it would be all right", he replied, "I'm terribly sorry, but I haven't". Stagg was nevertheless arrested and charged on the basis of claims that he had described aspects of the murder scene that only the killer would have known.

=== Trial ===
When the case reached the Old Bailey in September 1994, Mr Justice Ognall ruled that the police had shown "excessive zeal" and had tried to incriminate Stagg by "deceptive conduct of the grossest kind". He excluded all the entrapment evidence on the grounds that Stagg's descriptions of the murder were not nearly as close to the reality as the police had maintained. With no other evidence to present, the prosecution withdrew its case and Stagg was acquitted.

Keith Pedder, the case's lead detective, received heavy public criticism. Even after Stagg was (rightfully as it later turned out) cleared of the murder of Nickell, Pedder continued over subsequent years to promote his theory that Stagg was guilty. He told an ITV Real Crime documentary in 2001:

Colin Stagg has been through a version of justice, albeit truncated, and he has been found not guilty. But I wonder whether he can actually say hand on heart that he believes people will meet him in the street and believe that. I do not believe the system served anybody that particular day.

After Stagg's acquittal, Pedder took early retirement from the police. He later faced corruption charges, but the case was thrown out by the judge in a pre-trial hearing on the grounds of insufficient evidence.

== Reinvestigation and conviction ==
=== Cold case review ===
Every year on the anniversary of the killing, Scotland Yard came under pressure for progress. In the late 1990s, Nickell's murder was re-investigated as part of Operation Enigma, which was a national cross-force investigation into the unsolved murders of 207 women. Under new management, detectives began to collate evidence and files related to the case from 2000.

In 2002, ten years after the killing, Scotland Yard used a cold case review team, which used refined DNA techniques only recently made available. A small team of officers and retired veteran investigators analysed statements from witnesses, reassessed files on a number of potential suspects and examined the possibility that the case was linked to other crimes. Officers compared the injuries suffered by Nickell with other attacks and consulted forensic scientists about improvements in DNA matching. In July 2003, reports surfaced that, after 18 months of tests on Nickell's clothes, police had found a male DNA sample which did not match her boyfriend or son. The sample at the time was insufficient to confirm an identity, but was large enough to rule out suspects.

=== Robert Napper ===
In November 1993, sixteen months after Nickell's homicide, single mother Samantha Bisset and her four-year-old daughter Jazmine were murdered in their flat in Plumstead, London. The police detectives investigating the Bisset murders found the preponderance of similarities with the murder of Nickell very notable, and sat down to discuss this with the detectives from the Nickell murder. The Nickell detectives, who already had Stagg in custody at that time and thus had stopped looking for suspects, rejected – with "hostility" – the Bisset detectives' theory that the unknown murderer in the Bisset case was the true perpetrator in the Nickell case. The detective who later arrested Robert Napper for the Bisset murders also found the similarities convincing, and suggested Napper as a suspect in the murder of Rachel Nickell.

In 1995, Napper was convicted for the Bisset murders. In July 2006, the Scotland Yard team interviewed him for two days at Broadmoor. Napper, 40 years old at that time, had been diagnosed as having paranoid schizophrenia and Asperger syndrome and had been held at the secure institution for more than ten years. On 28 November 2007, Napper was charged with Nickell's murder. He appeared at City of Westminster Magistrates' Court on 4 December 2007, where he was granted bail on condition he remain at Broadmoor psychiatric hospital until another hearing on 20 December 2007. On 24 January 2008, he pleaded not guilty to Nickell's murder and the trial started on 11 November 2008. On 18 December 2008, at the Old Bailey, Napper pleaded guilty to the manslaughter of Rachel Nickell on the grounds of diminished responsibility. Mr Justice Griffith Williams said that Napper would be detained indefinitely at Broadmoor because he was "a very dangerous man".

== Aftermath ==
An internal review estimated that the 1992 pursuit had cost the public £3 million (equivalent to £6.5 million in 2025) and that vital scientific information had been missed.

Paul Britton, the criminal psychologist involved with the investigation, was charged with professional misconduct by the British Psychological Society, but in 2002, in lieu of any substantial hearings, further action was dismissed due to the delay in bringing proceedings.

André Hanscombe moved with his and Nickell's child to France. He was strongly critical of some of the reporters who tracked him and his son down to his "sanctuary" in the French countryside. In 1996 Hanscombe wrote a book titled The Last Thursday in July about his life with Nickell, coping with the homicide, how "media intrusion" drove him to move abroad, and life with their son afterwards. In 2017 Alex Hanscombe wrote a memoir, Letting Go: A True Story Of Murder, Loss & Survival, telling the story of his mother's murder and how he coped with his grief and trauma.

=== Stagg Damages ===
Stagg sued the police for damages totalling £1 million following the fourteen months he spent in custody. He has co-written and published two books about the case: Who Really Killed Rachel? (with novelist David Kessler) and, more recently, Pariah (with journalist Ted Hynds), the latter being published on the same day as the real culprit's appearance in court to enter a plea. In January 2007, the Home Office confirmed that Stagg would receive compensation for wrongful prosecution, with the amount to be set by an independent assessor. On 13 August 2008, it was announced that the compensation was £706,000 (equivalent to £1.2 million in 2025). In December 2008, Colin Stagg finally received a public apology from the Metropolitan Police for their previous involvement and prosecution of him in regard to the Nickell murder investigation. He also received an apology from Robert Napper, delivered via his QC.

=== Undercover Officer Damages ===
The undercover officer known as "Lizzie James" involved in the attempt to obtain evidence in the original investigation by befriending him took early retirement from the Metropolitan Police force in 1998. With the support of the Police Federation, she sued the Metropolitan Police for damages arising from the investigation claiming that the case ruined her career. In 2001, shortly before it was due to be heard, her case was settled out of court and she received £125,000 (equivalent to £0.2 million in 2025). Her solicitor said: "The willingness of the Metropolitan Police to pay substantial damages must indicate their recognition that she sustained serious psychiatric injury". The payout was widely criticised by various sources, particularly as Nickell's son – whose mother was murdered and whose life was further damaged by the willful ineptness of the original police work – had been granted £22,000 (less than a fifth of the amount paid to the undercover detective) from the Criminal Injuries Compensation Authority.

=== IPCC findings ===
Following an investigation, the Independent Police Complaints Commission (IPCC) released a report, dated 3 June 2010, into the actions of the Metropolitan Police Force and their handling of the murder investigation. It described a "catalogue of bad decisions and errors" by the Metropolitan Police which had resulted in Napper being free to kill Nickell. It said that officers missed a series of opportunities to take him off the streets and suggested the lives of Samantha Bisset and her four-year-old daughter, Jazmine, would also have been saved if police had acted on tip-offs, including one by Napper's mother.

Rachel Cerfontyne, an IPCC commissioner, said that police failed to investigate the 1989 report that he attacked a woman on Plumstead Common in London and no record of the telephone call can be found. She said, "It is clear that throughout the investigations into the 'Green Chain' rapes and Rachel Nickell's death there was a catalogue of bad decisions and errors made by the Metropolitan Police. The police failed to sufficiently investigate after Napper's mother called police to report that he had confessed to her that he had raped a woman and, inconceivably, they eliminated Napper from inquiries into the Green Chain rapes because he was over 6 feet tall. Without these errors, Robert Napper could have been off the streets before he killed Rachel Nickell and the Bissets, and before numerous women suffered violent sexual attacks at his hands". Detectives had decided to exclude anyone over 6 feet based on the description of a 5' 7" rapist. However, there were conflicting witness reports of the rapist's height, and Napper walked with a stoop. The IPCC said no police officer would face disciplinary action because they had all retired and one key senior detective had died. Criminal prosecutions were not considered.

== In popular culture ==
- Deceit – 2021 British television mini-series
- The Witness – 2026 Netflix series
- The Murder of Rachel Nickell – Netflix documentary

== See also ==
- Murder of Penny Bell – unsolved 1991 murder of a woman in London that was once linked to Nickell's
- Murder of Alison Shaughnessy – unsolved 1991 murder of a woman in London
