= Bollo Lane =

Street in London, England

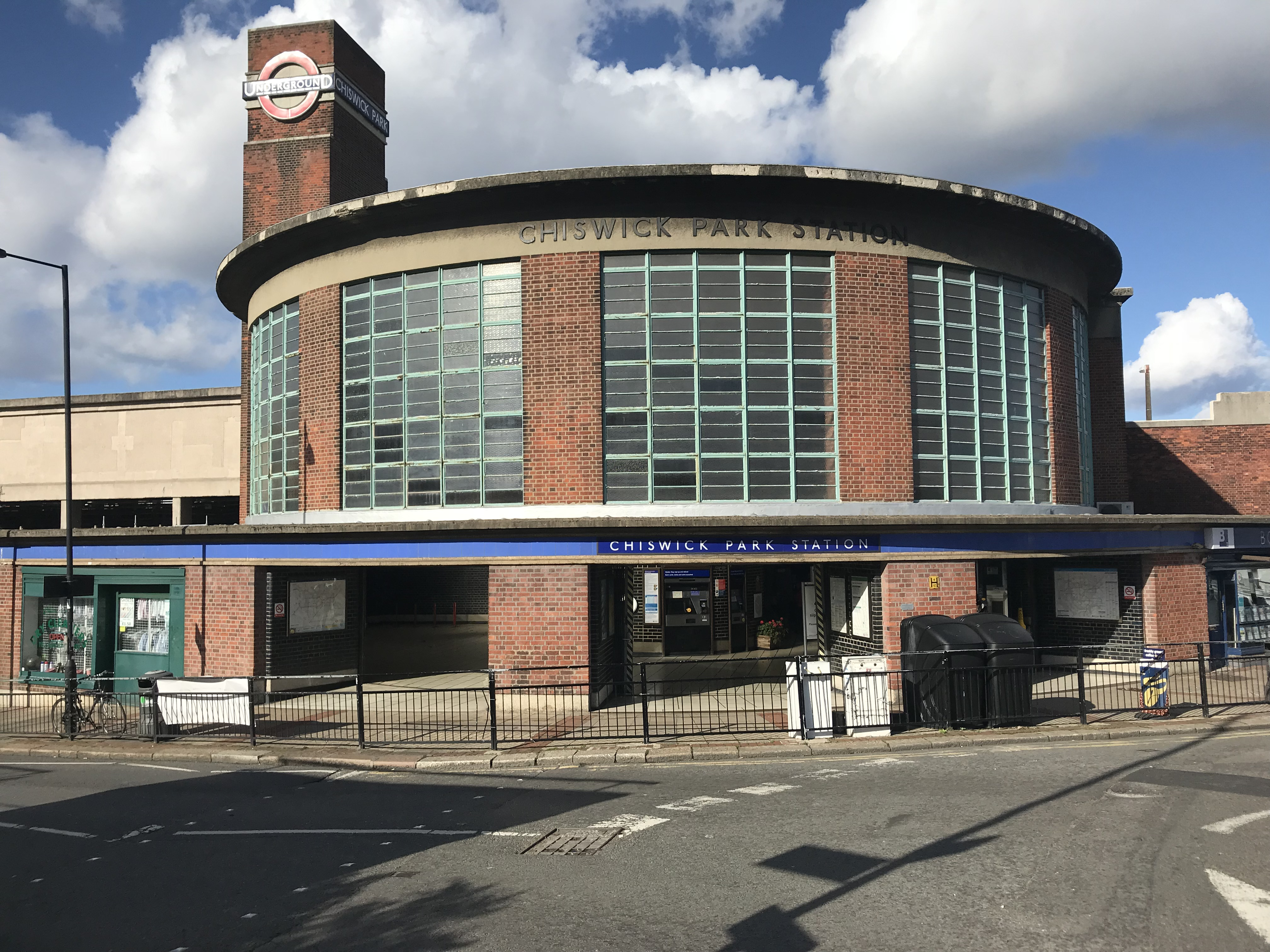
Chiswick Park tube station at the eastern end of Bollo Lane.

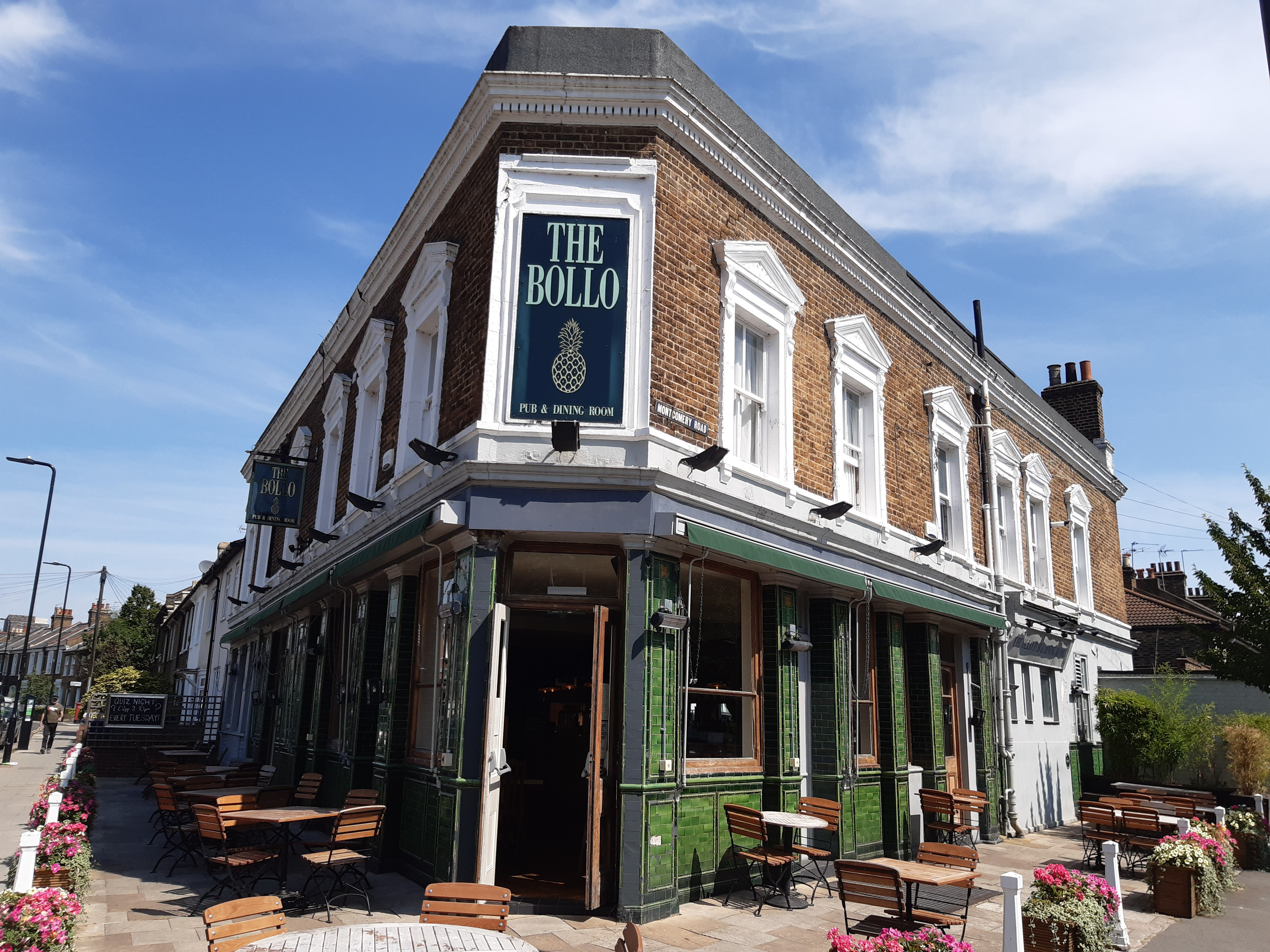
The Bollo pub.

Bollo Lane is a street in Acton in London running northeastwards from Chiswick Park tube station to Acton Town tube station. It is one of the oldest streets in the area, the name dating back to the Bollobridge over Stamford Brook in the twelfth century. The earliest reference to the street is as Bolhollane in 1408, the name meaning the "lane at Bull Hollow". It marks the boundary between the London Borough of Ealing to the north and the London Borough of Hounslow to the south. The Bollo pub is located in the street nearer to the Chiswick Park end.

== Bibliography ==
- Knights, David and Amanda. Acton Through Time. Amberley Publishing Limited, 2012.
- Mills, A.D. Dictionary of London Place Names. Oxford University Press, 2001.
- Pevsner, Nikolaus. London 2: South. Penguin, 1973.
- Talling, Paul. London's Lost Rivers: a beautifully illustrated guide to London's secret rivers. Random House, 2020.
