= Hammersmith & Chiswick railway station =

Former railway station in England

Hammersmith & Chiswick
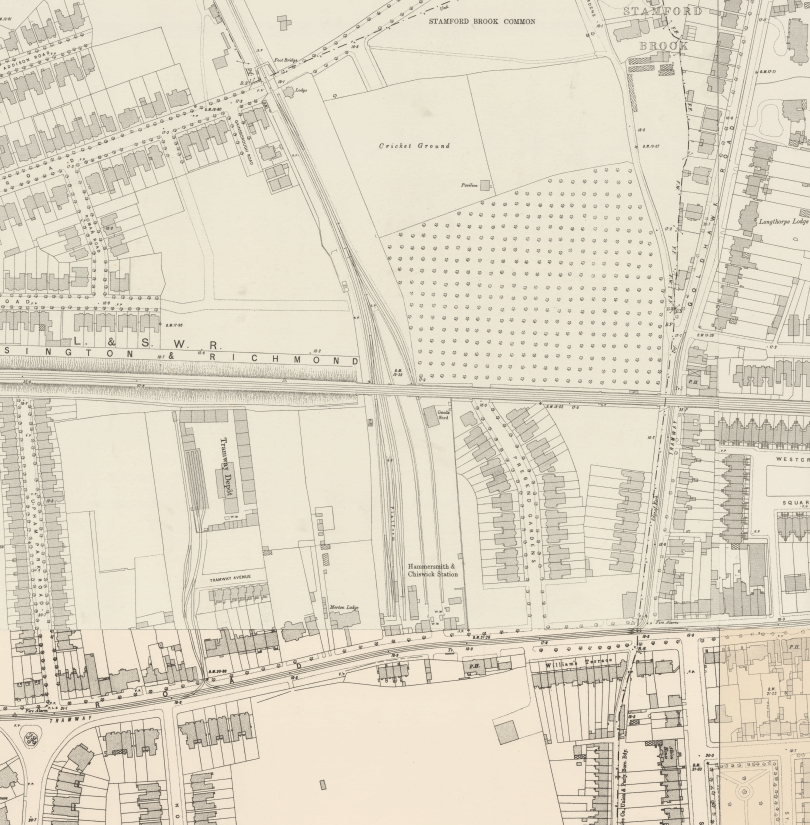
- Map of station, 1894
- Interactive map of Hammersmith & Chiswick

General information
- Location: Chiswick
- Owner: North & South Western Junction Railway
- Number of platforms: 1

Key dates
- 8 April 1858: Opened as Hammersmith
- 1 July 1880: Renamed Hammersmith & Chiswick
- 1 January 1917: Closed to Passengers
- 3 May 1965: Closed Completely
- Replaced by: Stamford Brook

Other information
- Coordinates: 51.4935°N 0.2477°W

Hammersmith & Chiswick was a railway terminus in west London that was opened in 1858 by the North & South Western Junction Railway and closed in 1917, during the First World War.

Originally named Hammersmith but renamed Hammersmith & Chiswick in 1880, the station was located midway between Chiswick and Hammersmith and was intended to serve both areas.

== History ==
Hammersmith station was opened on 8 April 1858 by the North & South Western Junction Railway (N&SWJR) on the site of a goods yard, which had opened on 1 May 1857, on Chiswick High Road in what was then a rural area. The station was at the end of a 1.5 mile (2.5 km) branch line which ran northward from the North London Railway (NLR) line at South Acton and turned sharply to run south into Hammersmith & Chiswick.

The station building was not purpose-built but was a converted private house. In 1904, a writer described it as "abounding with flowers, and resembling rather the terminus of some far distant country branch line than what one might expect to find at a place bearing the dual distinction of the names of two west London suburbs".

Until the interchange station at South Acton was opened on 1 January 1880, the branch line to Hammersmith & Chiswick employed an unusual mode of operation. Southbound NLR trains to Kew (which was on the western chord to the Hounslow Loop near the current Kew Bridge station) included a carriage for passengers travelling to Hammersmith & Chiswick. This carriage was uncoupled from the rest of the train immediately south of the junction. The N&SWJR's sole locomotive would then reverse onto the mainline, be attached to the carriage, and take it down the short branch to Hammersmith & Chiswick. From 1 January 1880, on the station opening at South Acton, passengers could change there from Broad Street to Richmond trains onto the Hammersmith & Chiswick services.

Before the interchange at South Acton opened, one train per hour served the branch, while thereafter until closure there was one train every half-hour.

In an effort to boost passenger numbers, which had been badly affected by the opening of the nearby District line station at Stamford Brook, three intermediate halts were opened on 8 April 1909: Rugby Road Halt, Woodstock Road Halt, and Bath Road Halt. These were little used, so trains stopped only on request.

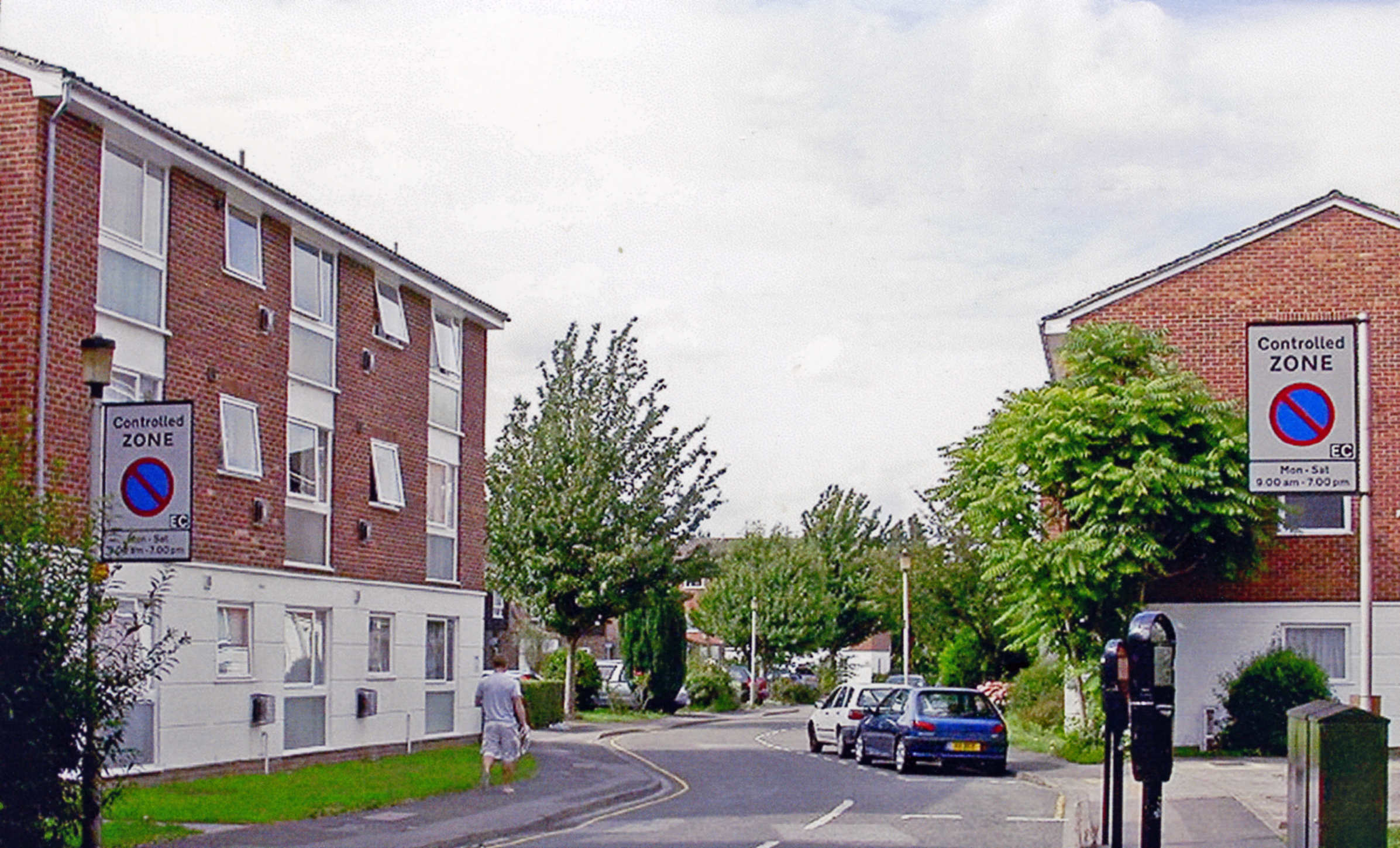
The site of the station, 2005

During the First World War, in 1917, all passenger services on the branch were suspended as a wartime economy measure and were never resumed. The three halts were closed only eight years after their opening. Hammersmith & Chiswick remained in use as a goods yard, primarily to serve a large coal depot. As the demand for coal reduced the branch was permanently closed on 3 May 1965.

The station site was redeveloped in the 1980s and no trace remains.

Preceding station	Disused railways	Following station
Bath Road	North & South Western Junction Railway; Hammersmith branch	Terminus
