= Woodstock Road railway station =

Former railway station in England

Woodstock Road
- Location of Woodstock Road in Greater London
- Location: Chiswick
- Owner: North & South Western Junction Railway
- Number of platforms: 1

Key dates
- 8 April 1909: Opened
- 1 January 1917: Closed
- Replaced by: None

Other information
- Coordinates: 51.5013°N 0.2529°W

Woodstock Road was a short-lived railway station in London on the Hammersmith & Chiswick branch line from South Acton to Hammersmith & Chiswick. The station was opened by the North & South Western Junction Railway in 1909 as an attempt to gain passenger numbers since the opening of the District Line.

Preceding station	Disused railways	Following station
Rugby Road	North & South Western Junction Railway; Hammersmith branch	Bath Road
