= Kew railway station =

Kew railway station may refer to the following:

- Kew railway station (England), a former station in Kew, London, England, on the North and South Western Junction Railway, which closed in 1863
- Kew railway station, Melbourne, a former station in Victoria, Australia

== See also ==
- Kew Bridge railway station, a current station on the Hounslow Loop Line in Kew, London
- Kew Gardens station (disambiguation), for various stations of that name
