= Bath Road railway station =

Disused railway station in England

Bath Road Halt
- Interactive map of Bath Road Halt

General information
- Location: Chiswick
- Owner: North & South Western Junction Railway
- Number of platforms: 1

Key dates
- 8 April 1909: Opened
- 1 January 1917: Closed
- Replaced by: None

Other information
- Coordinates: 51.4968°N 0.2490°W

Bath Road Halt was a short-lived railway station in London on the Hammersmith & Chiswick branch line from South Acton to Hammersmith & Chiswick. The station was opened by the North & South Western Junction Railway in 1909 as an attempt to gain passenger numbers since the opening of the District Line.

The platform was constructed out of timber as the stations were a later addition to the line. The location of the station was beside a signal box which had been added to the line as it was being constructed.

After the station was closed, the line continued to be used until the 60's as a goods traffic line. Nothing is left of the platforms or signal box. A house now stands on the site.

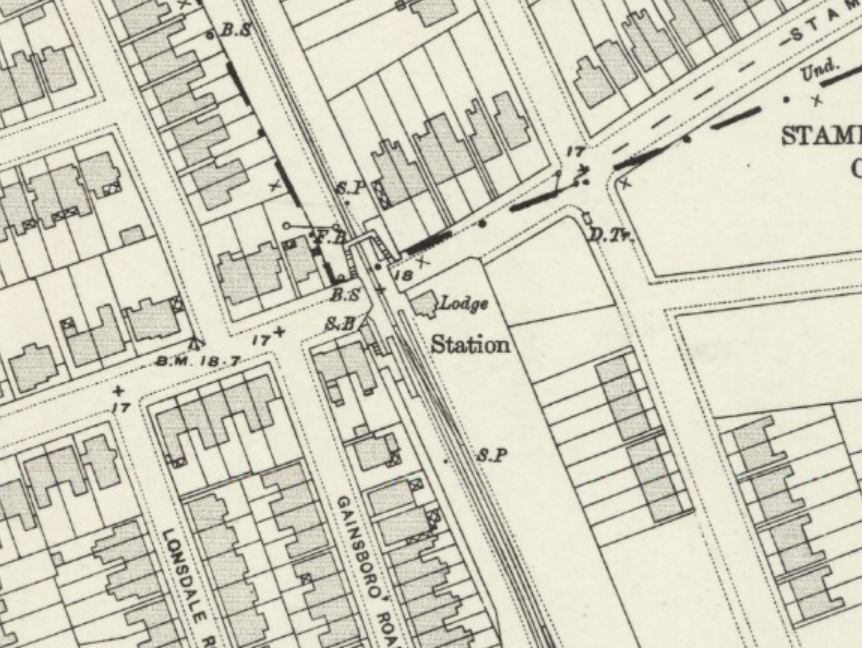
1915 Map containing Bath Road Halt

Preceding station	Disused railways	Following station
Woodstock Road	North & South Western Junction Railway; Hammersmith branch	Hammersmith & Chiswick
