= Kew Gardens station =

Kew Gardens station or Kew Gardens railway station may refer to:

- Kew Gardens station (London), London Underground and London Overground station in Kew, Richmond upon Thames, England
- Kew Gardens railway station (Merseyside), England
- Kew Gardens station (LIRR), Queens, New York City, United States
- Kew Gardens–Union Turnpike station, New York City Subway, United States

== See also ==
- Kew railway station (disambiguation)
- Botanical Garden (disambiguation) § Transport
