= Rugby Road Halt railway station =

Former railway station in England

Rugby Road Halt
- The site of the station in 2020

- Location of Rugby Road Halt in Greater London
- Location: Chiswick
- Owner: North & South Western Junction Railway
- Number of platforms: 1

Key dates
- 8 April 1909: Opened
- 1 January 1917: Closed
- Replaced by: None

Other information
- Coordinates: 51.5033°N 0.2567°W

Rugby Road Halt was a short lived railway station in London on the Hammersmith & Chiswick branch line from South Acton to Hammersmith & Chiswick. The station was opened by the North & South Western Junction Railway in 1909 as an attempt to gain passenger numbers since the opening of the District Line. It consisted of a short wooden platform long enough for one coach. The station closed in 1917.

| Preceding station | Disused railways | Following station |
|---|---|---|
| South Acton | North & South Western Junction Railway; Hammersmith branch | Woodstock Road |
