= Chiswick railway station =

British railway station

Chiswick
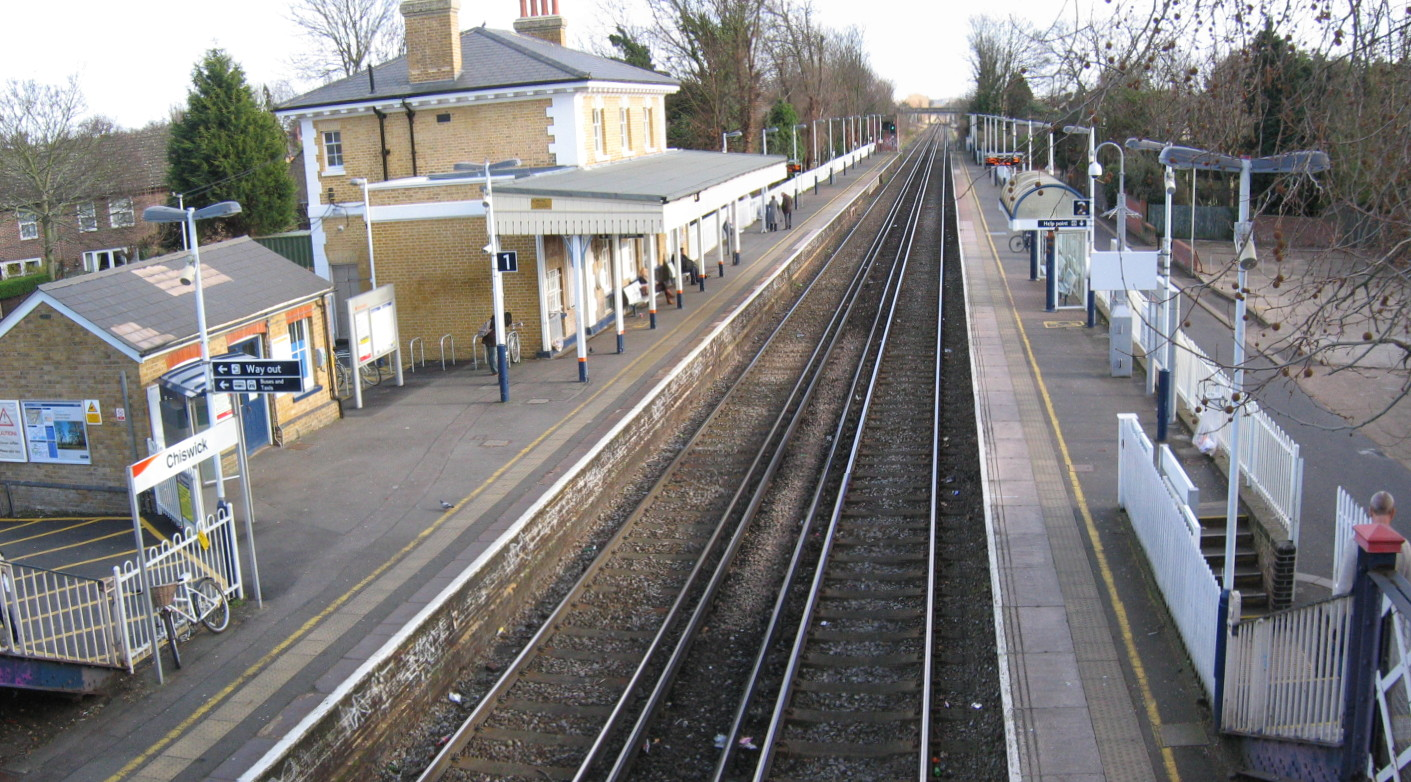
- Interactive map of Chiswick

General information
- Location: Chiswick
- Local authority: London Borough of Hounslow
- Managed by: South Western Railway
- Owner: Network Rail
- Station code: CHK
- DfT category: E
- Number of platforms: 2
- Accessible: Yes
- Fare zone: 3

National Rail annual entry and exit
- 2020–21: ▼0.276 million
- 2021–22: ▲0.546 million
- 2022–23: ▲0.589 million
- 2023–24: ▲0.646 million
- 2024–25: ▲0.707 million

Key dates
- 22 August 1849: opened

Other information
- External links: Departures; Facilities
- Coordinates: 51.4813°N 0.2683°W

Designations

Listed Building – Grade II
- Official name: Chiswick Railway Station
- Designated: 29 November 2002; 23 years ago
- Reference no.: 1096022

Chiswick railway station is a railway station within the Grove Park residential area of Chiswick in the London Borough of Hounslow. The station is on the Hounslow Loop Line, and all trains serving it are operated by South Western Railway. Journey time into London Waterloo is approximately 25 minutes and Clapham Junction 15 minutes. The station is in London fare zone 3 and is Grade II listed.

Chiswick station is the nearest station to Chiswick House and gardens. It is 20 minutes' walk, and separated by A4 arterial road subways, from the commercial part of town, Chiswick High Road, which is served by Gunnersbury (District line and London Overground), Turnham Green and Stamford Brook stations.

== Services ==
All services at Chiswick are operated by South Western Railway.

The typical off-peak service in trains per hour is:

- 2 tph to London Waterloo via Barnes
- 2 tph to Weybridge via Hounslow

Additional services, including trains to and from London Waterloo via Richmond call at the station during the peak hours.

On Sundays, the service is reduced to hourly in each direction and westbound trains run to and from Woking instead of Weybridge.

Preceding station	National Rail	Following station
Barnes Bridge	South Western Railway Hounslow Loop Line	Kew Bridge

== Connections ==
London Buses route E3 serves the station.
