= British Rail Class 936 =

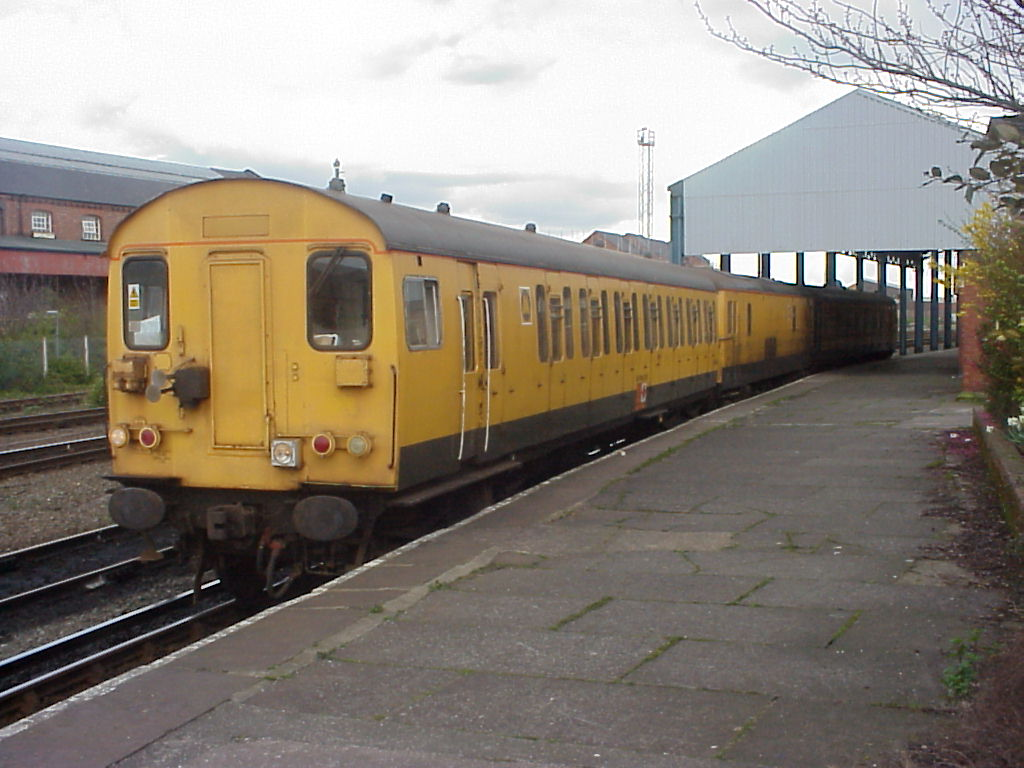
- Unit 936003 in service on the Merseyrail network at Chester in 1999. A Class 73 locomotive is sandwiched between the two driving carriages.
- Operator: Network Rail

Specifications
- Electric system: 750 V DC third rail
- Track gauge: 1,435 mm (4 ft 8 1/2 in) standard gauge

The British Rail Class 936 was reserved for former electrical multiple units not from the South-East, converted for departmental use. Units were converted for various tasks, including application of sandite, and de-icing duties.

Key:	In service	Preserved	Scrapped

Merseyrail Units

Unit No.		Converted	Use	Former Class	Final livery	Original Formation		Wdn.	Status
Current	Original	Converted	Use	Former Class	Final livery	DM	DT	Wdn.	Status
936001	501178	1984	Sandite/De-icing unit	501	Merseyrail Yellow	977345 ex.61178	977346 ex.75178	1995	Scrapped (2002)
936002	501180	1984	Sandite/De-icing unit	501	Merseyrail Yellow	977347 ex.61180	977348 ex.75180	1995	Scrapped (2002)
936003	501183	1984	Sandite/De-icing unit	501	Merseyrail Yellow	977349 ex.61183	977350 ex.75183	2002	Preserved

Scottish Units

Unit No.		Converted	Use	Former Class	Final livery	Original Formation			Wdn.	Status
Current	Original	Converted	Use	Former Class	Final livery	DT	M	DT	Wdn.	Status
936103	311103	1994	Sandite unit	311	Railtrack Brown	977844 ex.76414	977845 ex.62174	977846 ex.76433	1999	Preserved
936104	311104	1994	Sandite unit	311	Railtrack Brown	977847 ex.76415	977848 ex.62175	977849 ex.76434	1999	Scrapped (2002)
