= Kew Gardens station (London) =

London Underground and London Overground station

Kew Gardens
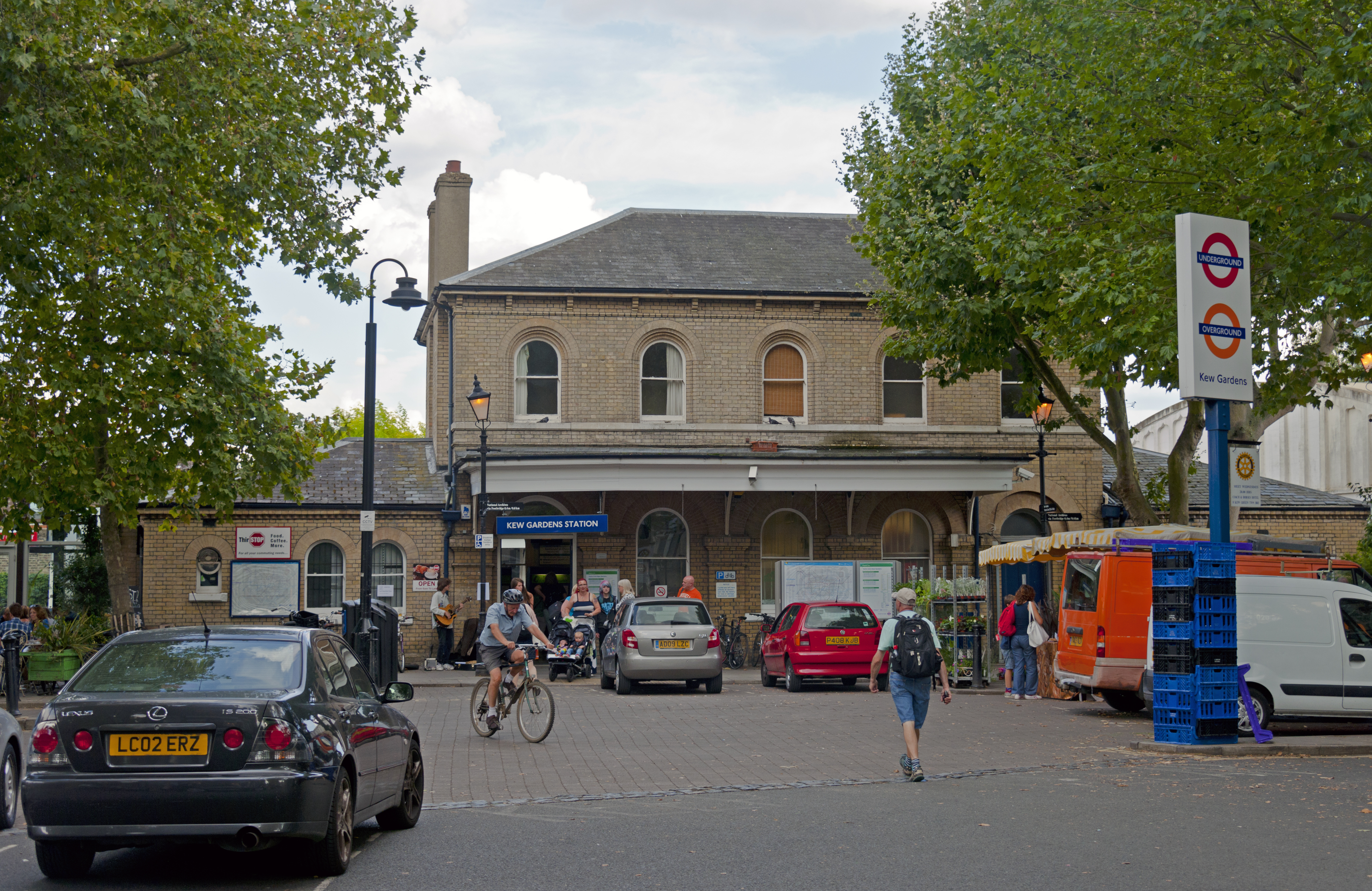
- Main entrance on the eastbound side, 2014
- Interactive map of Kew Gardens

General information
- Location: Kew
- Local authority: London Borough of Richmond upon Thames
- Managed by: London Underground
- Owner: Network Rail
- Station code: KWG
- DfT category: D
- Number of platforms: 2
- Accessible: Yes
- Fare zone: 3 and 4

London Underground annual entry and exit
- 2020: ▼1.81 million
- 2021: ▲2.15 million
- 2022: ▲3.97 million
- 2023: ▼3.94 million
- 2024: ▼3.08 million

National Rail annual entry and exit
- 2020–21: ▼0.412 million
- 2021–22: ▲0.972 million
- 2022–23: ▲1.223 million
- 2023–24: ▲1.382 million
- 2024–25: ▼1.369 million

Key dates
- 1 January 1869: Opened (L&SWR)
- 1869: Started (NLR)
- 1870: Started and Ended (GWR)
- 1 June 1877: Started (MR and DR)
- 1 January 1894: Started (GWR)
- 31 December 1906: Ended (MR)
- 31 December 1910: Ended (GWR)
- 3 June 1916: Ended (L&SWR)

Other information
- External links: TfL station info page; Departures; Facilities
- Coordinates: 51.4771°N 0.2853°W

Designations

Listed Building – Grade II
- Official name: Kew Gardens station
- Designated: 26 September 2002; 23 years ago
- Reference no.: 1031878

Kew Gardens is a Grade II–listed interchange station on the District line of the London Underground and the Mildmay line of the London Overground. Located in Kew in the London Borough of Richmond upon Thames, it first opened in 1869 and is now managed by London Underground. The station, which is in London fare zone 3 and 4, is situated midway between Gunnersbury and Richmond stations.

The station is the nearest to Kew Gardens, about 500 yards (460 m) to the west, and The National Archives, about 600 yards (550 m) to the north east. Kew Gardens Station Footbridge, also a Grade II-listed structure, is next to the station, on the southern side.

== Access ==
The main entrance to the station is at the junction of Station Parade, Station Avenue and Station Approach, about 100 yards (90 m) from Sandycombe Road (B353) and gives access to the eastbound service. There is also an entrance, which is wheelchair-accessible, on North Road, on the other side of the railway line with access to the westbound service; the two entrances are connected by a pedestrian subway.

== History ==
The station was opened by the London and South Western Railway (L&SWR) on 1 January 1869, in an area of market gardens and orchards. The station was located on a new L&SWR branch line to Richmond built from the West London Joint Railway starting north of Addison Road station (now Kensington (Olympia)). The line ran through Shepherd's Bush and Hammersmith via a now closed curve and Grove Road station (also now closed) in Hammersmith. Via a short connection from the North & South Western Junction Railway (N&SWJR) to Gunnersbury the line was also served by the North London Railway (NLR).

Between 1 June 1870 and 31 October 1870, the Great Western Railway (GWR) briefly ran services from Paddington to Richmond via Hammersmith & City Railway (now the Hammersmith & City line) tracks to Grove Road then on the L&SWR tracks through Kew Gardens.

On 1 June 1877, the District Railway (DR, now the District line) opened a short extension from its terminus at Hammersmith to connect to the L&SWR tracks east of Ravenscourt Park station. The DR then began running trains over the L&SWR tracks to Richmond. On 1 October 1877, the Metropolitan Railway (MR, now the Metropolitan line) restarted the GWR's former service to Richmond via Grove Road station.

The DR's service between Richmond, Hammersmith and central London was more direct than the NLR's route via Willesden Junction, the L&SWR's or the MR's routes via Grove Road station or the L&SWR's other route from Richmond via Clapham Junction. From 1 January 1894, the GWR began sharing the MR's Richmond service and served Kew Gardens once again, meaning that passengers from Kew Gardens could travel on the services of five operators.

Following the electrification of the DR's own tracks north of Acton Town in 1903, the DR funded the electrification of the tracks on the Richmond branch, including those through Kew Gardens. This was completed on 1 August 1905 and DR services on the line were then operated with electric trains. However, the L&SWR, NLR, GWR and MR services continued to be steam-hauled.

MR services were withdrawn on 31 December 1906 and GWR services were withdrawn on 31 December 1910, leaving operations at Kew Gardens and Gunnersbury to the DR (by then known as the District Railway), the NLR and L&SWR. By 1916, the L&SWR's route through Hammersmith was being out-competed by the District to such a degree that the L&SWR withdrew its service between Richmond and Addison Road on 3 June 1916, leaving the District as the sole operator over that route.

A brass plaque at the station commemorates its reopening on 7 October 1989 by Michael Portillo MP, Minister of State for Transport, after it had been refurbished.

== Present ==
The two-storey yellow brick station buildings are unusually fine examples of mid-Victorian railway architecture and are protected as part of the Kew Gardens conservation area. The station is one of the few remaining 19th-century stations on the North London line and had one of the last illuminated banner signals on the London Underground, possibly because of the footbridge. This signal was replaced by an electronic version in 2011.

Kew Gardens is the only station on the London Underground network that has a pub attached to it. The pub has a door (no longer in use) which leads out onto platform 1. Previously known as The Railway, and subsequently as The Pig and Parrot and as The Flower and Firkin, the pub reopened after renovation in 2013 as The Tap on the Line.

== Kew Gardens Station Footbridge ==
Kew Gardens Station Footbridge
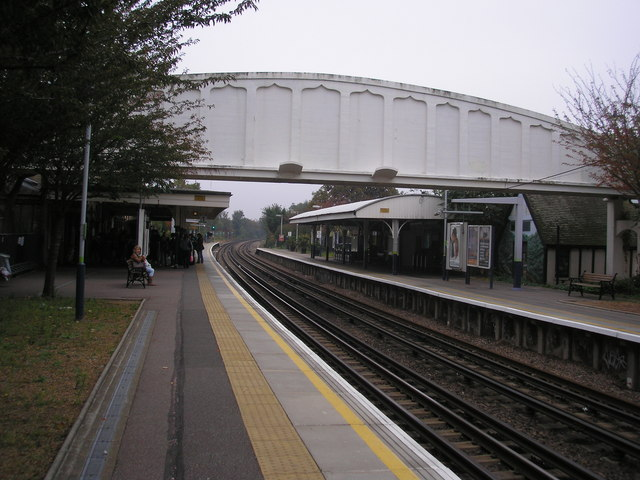
- Coordinates: 51.476911°N 0.285107°W
- Carries: Pedestrians
- Crosses: Railway
- Locale: Kew, London

Characteristics
- Longest span: 23 metres

History
- Opened: 1912

Statistics

Listed Building – Grade II
- Official name: Footbridge at Kew Gardens station
- Designated: 26 September 2002
- Reference no.: 1031879

Location
- Interactive map of Kew Gardens Station Footbridge

The footbridge to the south of the station is also noteworthy and is Grade II-listed in its own right. The railway line bisected Kew, but it was not until 1912 that the bridge was provided to allow residents to cross the tracks safely (previously, a level crossing was used, with the added disadvantage of delaying trains). It is a rare surviving example of a reinforced concrete structure built using a pioneering technique devised by the French engineer François Hennebique. The bridge has a narrow deck and very high walls, originally designed to protect its users' clothing from the smoke of steam trains passing underneath. It also has protrusions on either side of the deck to deflect smoke away from the bridge structure. It was restored in 2004 with a grant from the Heritage Lottery Fund, in a project led by The Kew Society. In July 2017, concerns were expressed about the structural safety of the bridge.

== Services ==
Kew Gardens currently has the following London Underground (District line) and London Overground (Mildmay line) services, which are operated by the London Underground S7 stock and British Rail Class 378 trains respectively:

=== London Underground (District line) ===
- 6 trains per hour (tph) to Upminster
- 6 tph to Richmond

=== London Overground (Mildmay line) ===
- 4 tph to Stratford
- 4 tph to Richmond
- 4 tph each way on Sundays

Preceding station	London Overground	Following station
Richmond Terminus	Mildmay line North London line	Gunnersbury towards Stratford
Preceding station	London Underground	Following station
Richmond Terminus	District line Richmond branch	Gunnersbury towards Upminster
Former services
Richmond Terminus	London and South Western Railway (1869–1916)	Gunnersbury towards West Brompton
Richmond Terminus	Metropolitan Railway (1877–1906)	Gunnersbury towards Paddington
Richmond Terminus	Great Western Railway (1894–1910)	Gunnersbury towards Paddington

== Connections ==
There are no lifts. Platform 2 (going towards central London) is at ground level. Platform 1 (going towards Richmond) is reached by a short set of 10 steps; there is also a wheelchair-accessible ramp.

London Buses route 110 serves the station.

== In popular culture ==
Kew Gardens station appeared in the BBC comedy drama Love Soup (Series 2, Episode 1 – Smoke and Shadows, 1 March 2008) as the fictional "Hove West" station.

== See also ==
- Kew Bridge railway station
- North Sheen railway station
