= British Rail Class 501 =

Class of British electric multiple units

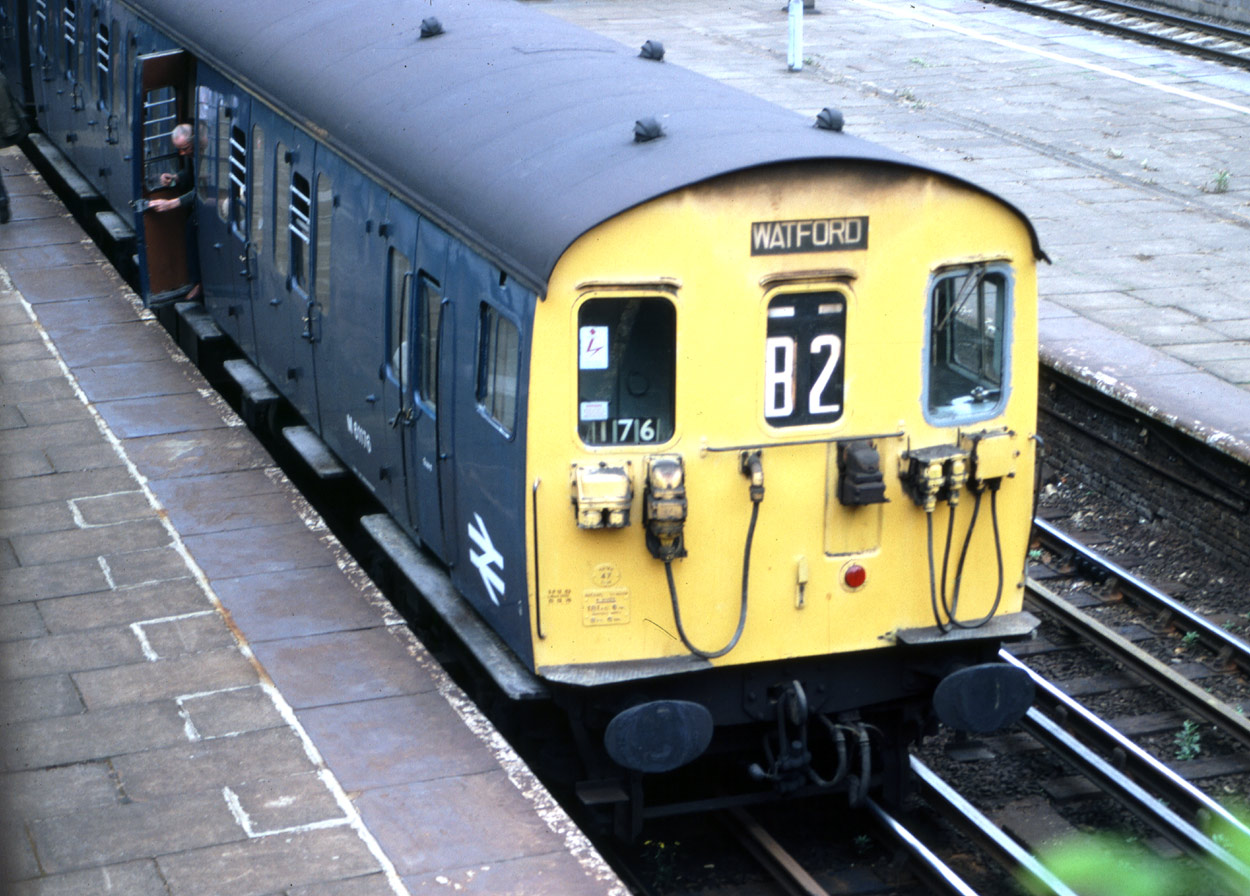
- A northbound Class 501 train calls at Harrow & Wealdstone. The B2 headcode signifies that this train worked the Broad Street-Watford via Primrose Hill (and vice versa) service.
- In service: 1957-1985
- Manufacturer: British Railways
- Built at: Eastleigh Works
- Replaced: LNWR electric units
- Entered service: 1957-58
- Refurbished: 1980
- Number built: 57 trainsets
- Number preserved: 2 cars (1 DMBS, 1 DTBS)
- Number scrapped: 56 sets
- Formation: Power car + trailer + driving trailer DMBS+TS+DTBS
- Diagram: EB201 (DMBS); EH213 (TS); EG201 (DTBS)
- Fleet numbers: 501133-501189 (sets); 61133-61189 (DMBS); 70133-70189 (TS); 75133-75189 (DTBS)
- Capacity: 256 seats (total, as built); 242 seats (total, 1980-); 74 seats (DMBS); 108 seats (TS, as built); 94 seats (TS, 1980-); 74 seats (DTBS)
- Operator: British Rail
- Depot: Croxley Green
- Lines served: Watford DC Line; North London Line

Specifications
- Car body construction: Steel
- Train length: 181 ft 9 in (55.40 m)
- Car length: 57 ft 5 in (17.50 m) (DMBS, DTBS); 57 ft 1 in (17.40 m) (TS)
- Width: 9 ft 6 in (2.90 m)
- Height: 12 ft 8 in (3.86 m)
- Floor height: 3 ft 9 in (1,140 mm)
- Doors: Slam
- Articulated sections: 3
- Wheelbase: 40 ft 0 in (12.19 m) (bogie centres, per car)
- Maximum speed: 70 mph (110 km/h)
- Weight: 106 t (104 long tons; 117 short tons) (total); 47 t (46 long tons; 52 short tons) (DMBS); 29 t (29 long tons; 32 short tons) (TS); 30 t (30 long tons; 33 short tons) (DTBS)
- Traction motors: 4 × 185 hp (138 kW) GEC
- Power output: 740 hp (550 kW)
- HVAC: Electric
- Electric systems: 630 V DC third rail and fourth rail
- Current collection: Contact shoe
- UIC classification: Bo'Bo'+2'2'+2'2'
- Bogies: Mk2
- Braking system: Air (EP/Auto)
- Safety system: Window bars
- Coupling system: Screw
- Multiple working: Within class only
- Track gauge: 1,435 mm (4 ft 8 1/2 in) standard gauge

Notes/references
- Ten cars converted to Classes 97/7 and 936 de-icing vehicles in 1984, for departmental use

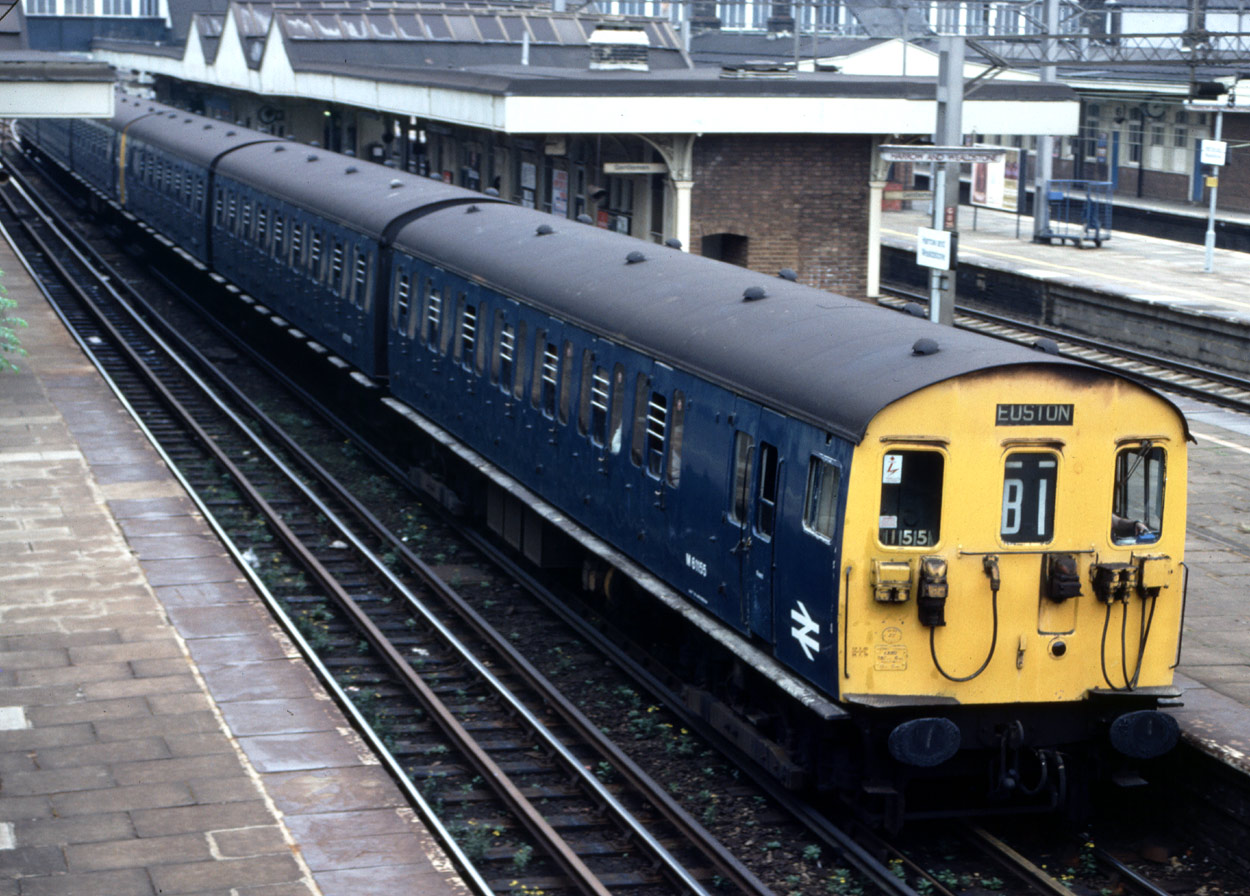
A London-bound Class 501 train calls at Harrow and Wealdstone. The B1 headcode signifies that this train worked the Euston-Watford (and vice versa) service.

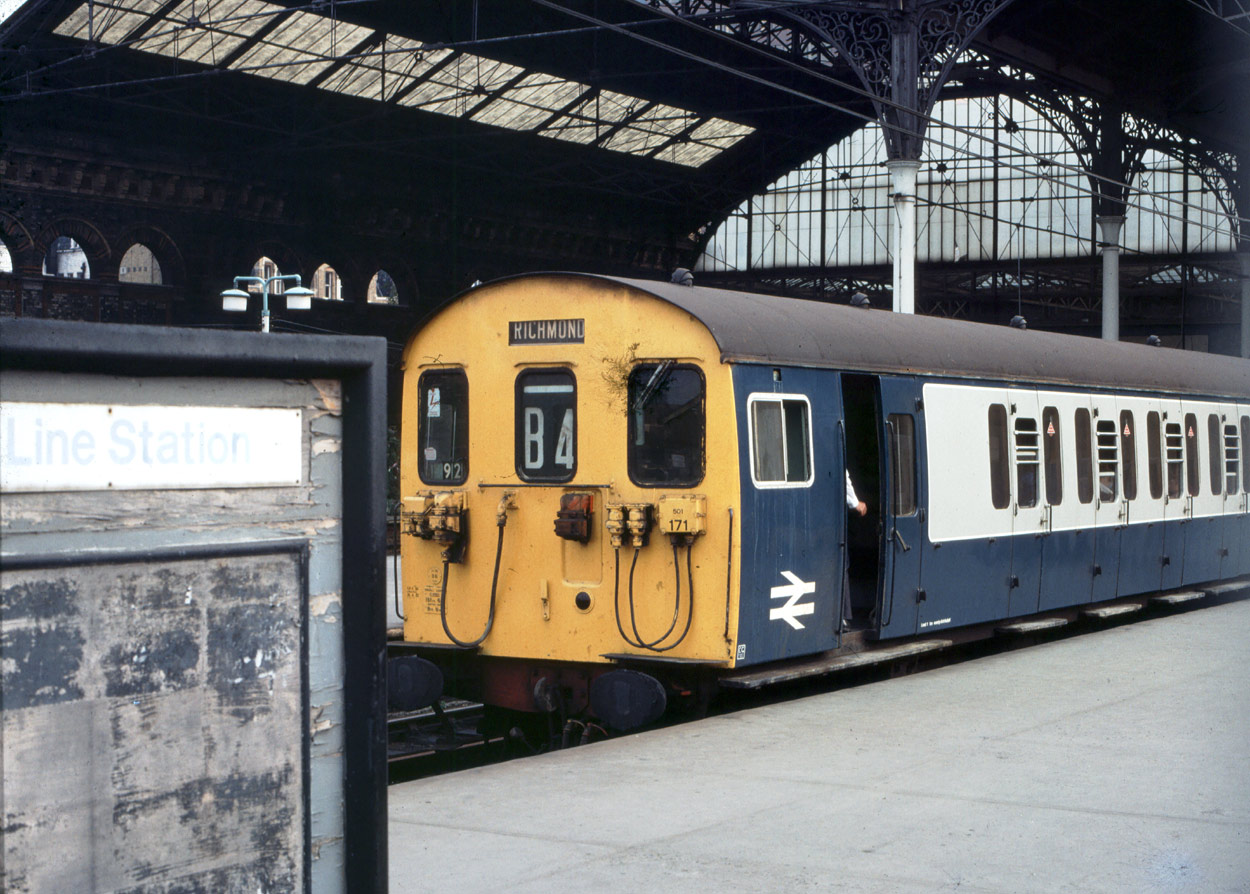
A refurbished Class 501 train awaits departure time at Broad Street station, shortly before the latter's closure. The B4 headcode signifies that this train worked the Broad Street—Richmond (and vice versa) service.

The British Rail Class 501 electric multiple units were built in 1955/56 for use on the former LNWR/LMS suburban electric network of the London Midland Region. A total of 57 three-car units were built.

== Services ==
The services worked by the Class 501 units consisted of a small self-contained group of lines, which were electrified at 630 V DC on the 3rd and 4th rail principle, linking London Euston to Watford, Broad Street with both Richmond and Watford plus the Croxley Green branch — which was mostly served by shuttle trains from Watford. Some of these services were partially jointly operated with London Underground's Bakerloo and District Lines. In 1970 the trains were converted to 3rd rail only operation, although the 4th rail was retained on sections of line which are shared with London Underground trains.

The original electric scheme on these lines was at 630 V DC, which was actually supplied at +420 V in the outer electric rail and -210 V in the centre one, a total potential difference of 630 V. This was the same system as used at the time (and still employed today) by London Underground, and allowed Underground trains to run over the lines, from Queens Park to Watford (Bakerloo line) and Gunnersbury to Richmond (District line). In 1970 it was decided to convert to the normal arrangement of the full positive current of +630V in the outer rail, and to use the normal running rails for the return current at 0 potential. This required adaptation of the Class 501 trains to return current through the wheels instead of the centre rail. On the sections shared with the Underground trains the centre rail was retained, but was now also at zero potential and just bonded electrically to the running rails. No modifications were required on the Underground trains for this change, but electrical switching units are at the lineside where Underground trains pass from one system to the other.

== Description ==
The Class 501 units were built by British Railways in its own workshops at Eastleigh on short 57 ft (17.37 m) frames supplied by Ashford.

Despite British Railways having recently built modern sliding door trains for electric suburban services in Manchester and Liverpool and on the Great Eastern Main Line (classes 506, 503 and 306 respectively), it was decided that these trains would closely resemble the EPB stock of the Southern Region, which featured individual passenger-operated doors located at each seating bay. To prevent passengers leaning out of the opening windows, they were partially blocked with three bars — this was for passenger safety when travelling through areas with limited clearance, in particular Hampstead Tunnel. This earned them the nickname "jail units". The stock differed from that for the Southern Region in that each vehicle was 57-foot (17.37 m) long instead of 63 ft 6 in (19.35 m), and the vehicles within the units had screw coupling with two buffers instead of the close-coupled single buffer with chain arrangement used on the Southern multiple units.

== Formation ==
The trains were made up in 3-car formations as follows: Driving motor with two saloons of 3+4 bays + 9 compartment intermediate trailer + driving trailer with two saloons of 3+4 bays. Unusually for the time, the vehicles featured screw couplings both within and between the units, in contrast to the SR units which had intermediate single buffer and chain and buckeye couplings at the unit ends. Although all other areas of the London Midland region had trains with both first and second class accommodation, the inner London area had withdrawn first class from main line trains operated entirely within the London Transport boundaries as a wartime measure in 1940. It was never reinstated, so these trains were second class only.

== Electrical equipment ==
The motor coaches had two powered bogies and GEC electrical equipment. They were the first to have camshaft controllers. The train ends also followed the EPB style and incorporated a two-character alphanumerical headcode.

=== Motors ===
There were four 185 hp GEC traction motors giving a total of 740 hp per 3-car set.

== Livery ==
Initially these trains were painted in the standard mid-green livery adopted for electric multiple unit stock at nationalisation. This was replaced by a dark brunswick green livery with wide yellow bands in the early 1960s, the same livery as had been adopted for diesel multiple unit stock. In the late 1960s this was changed to rail blue, and from 1981, units sent for general overhaul received rail blue and grey livery.

== Modification ==
They were never facelifted or refurbished during their career; however, during the 1970s some trains had the intermediate trailers modified from compartment layout to open saloon. This work was carried out at Croxley Green workshops and, though quite neatly done, the overhead luggage racks which had been attached to the partitions were not replaced, leaving nowhere to put things like coats and umbrellas.

== Withdrawal ==
The trains, which were allocated to Croxley Green depot, were withdrawn from operation in May 1985. The trains on the east–west orbital service, from Broad Street to Richmond, were replaced with Class 416 units from the Southern Region, from the first day of the service being diverted and extended from Broad Street around eastern London to North Woolwich station. Services between London Euston/Broad Street and Watford and on the Croxley Green branch were subsequently replaced by sliding door Class 313 units.

== Service reduction ==
The services they were used on were subject to considerable contraction during their lifetime. The 57 units initially replaced the 77 LNWR "Oerlikon" 3-car sets on these lines, and the 25 additional sets built by the LMS in 1927 (giving over 100 3-car sets on these lines) were withdrawn in the early 1960s without replacement. After this numbers of the Class 501 were subject to early withdrawal in the 1960s-70s (45 of the 57 units remained in traffic by 1976), and the final stage was reached where they were replaced by a small number of class 313 sets which were spare from the 1970s GN electrification. The Richmond lines were initially covered by ex-SR sets as stated above, but ultimately all the 501s territory was covered by 313s which had become spare. Furthermore, the London Underground Bakerloo line, which initially shared the system from Queens Park to Watford, was very substantially cut back and ultimately withdrawn north of Harrow & Wealdstone. The decline in traffic on the 501s' territory is unparalleled by any other electrified service in London. The substantial peak services operated by the units from London's Broad Street terminus, to Richmond and Watford, were completely withdrawn during their lifetime.

== Numbering ==
British Railways numbers were:

- Motor Open Brake Second, M61133—M61189
- Trailer Open Second, M70133—M70189
- Driving Trailer Open Brake Second, M75133—M75189

== Further use ==
- Ten Class 501 DMBS carriages were converted to Class 97/7 battery locomotives.
- Two carriages, DTS 75186 and TS 70170, went on to work at MOD Marchwood.
- Three two-car units were converted to Class 936 sandite units, and saw use until the early 2000s.

Two 3-car units (xx162 & xx165) were transferred to the SR as Departmental Test Units 051 & 052 in 1969 but did not last long. Formations: 051: M61162 - DB975027; M70162 - DB975028; M75162 - DB975029. 052: M61165 - DB975030; M70165 - DB975031; M75165 - DB975032. 052 was withdrawn by 1970 and 051 was reformed as DB975029-DB975027-DB975030, but was withdrawn in late 1970, and the vehicles scrapped, except for one remaining DTBSO M75165. This was rebuilt to EPB standards and converted for Departmental Use in 1976 as Test Coach “Mars” ADB975032, based at Strawberry Hill, for commissioning refurbished Class 410/411/412 EMUs, but was scrapped on site by MRJ Phillips (contractors) in August 1987. One DMBSO was used as a Depot Pilot Unit No: 977385, nicknamed “The Beast”, at Strawberry Hill Depot for several years, numbered 501, but was later withdrawn and scrapped in 1995.

== Preservation ==
Currently two vehicles are preserved. The two carriages used by the MOD were put up for disposal in early 2006. The driving trailer, no. 75186, was saved for preservation and moved to the Electric Railway Museum, Warwickshire. It was joined by driving motor no. 61183 in October 2006. It was hoped that the centre trailer coach would also be preserved, but this was scrapped in 2006.

When the Electric Railway Museum closed in 2017, DMBSO 61183 and DTBSO 75186 were moved to a private site at Finmere Railway Station, on the former Great Central Main line (closed 1966) in Buckinghamshire. However, in January 2020 the station site was vacated and handed over to HS2, and 61183 and 75186 were moved to MoD Bicester for storage.
