= Kew Bridge railway station =

National Rail station in London, England

Kew Bridge
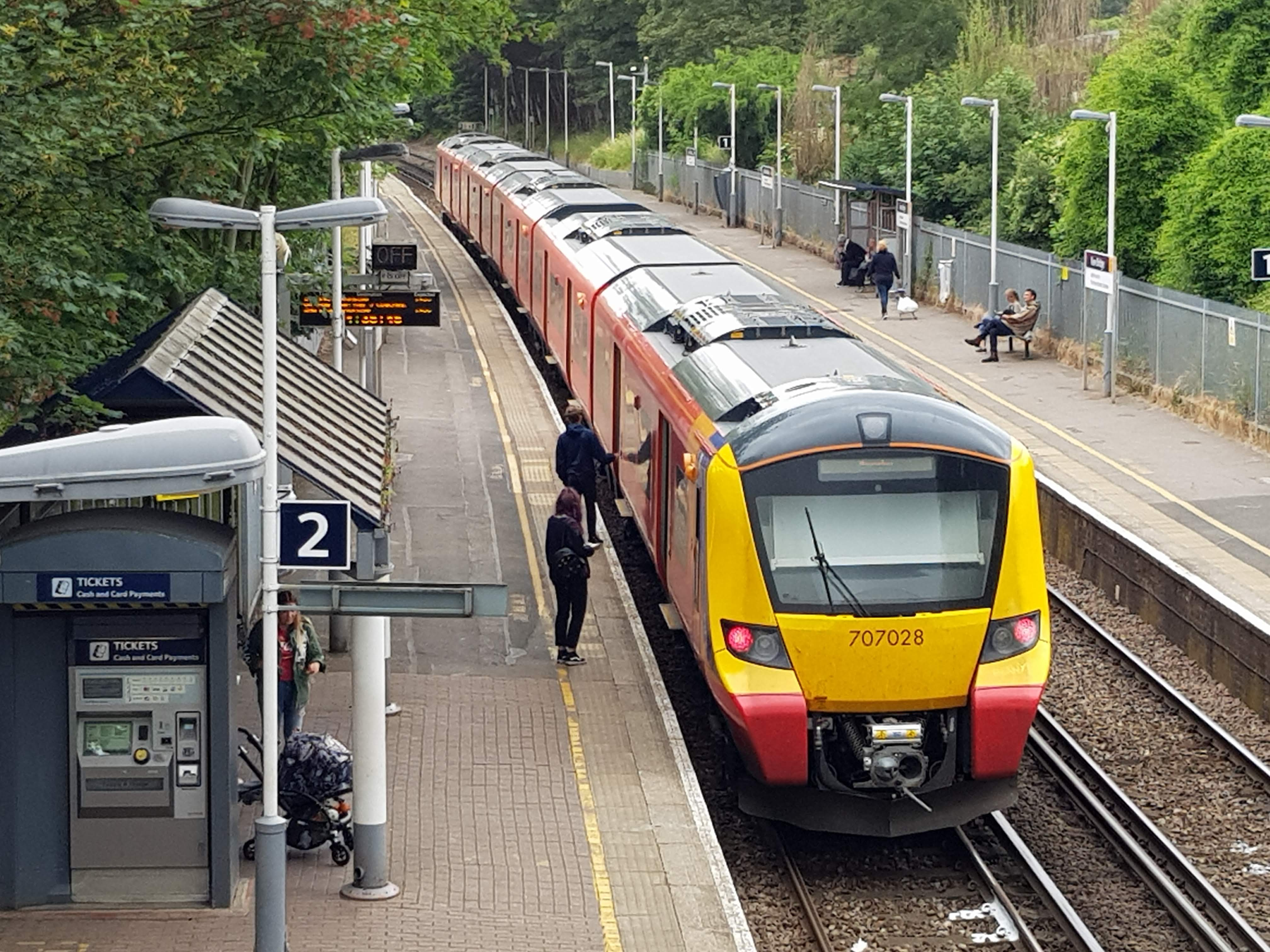
- Kew Bridge station with platform shelters and Class 707 EMU no.707028 calls on platform 2 in June 2018
- Interactive map of Kew Bridge

General information
- Location: Brentford
- Local authority: London Borough of Hounslow
- Grid reference: TQ189781
- Managed by: South Western Railway
- Owner: Network Rail
- Station code: KWB
- DfT category: F1
- Number of platforms: 2
- Fare zone: 3

National Rail annual entry and exit
- 2020–21: ▼0.356 million
- 2021–22: ▲0.810 million
- 2022–23: ▲0.952 million
- 2023–24: ▲1.057 million
- 2024–25: ▲1.162 million

Railway companies
- Original company: Windsor, Staines and South Western Railway
- Pre-grouping: London and South Western Railway
- Post-grouping: Southern Railway

Key dates
- 22 August 1849: Opened as Kew
- 1 January 1869: Renamed Kew Bridge

Other information
- External links: Departures; Facilities
- Coordinates: 51.4895°N 0.2878°W

Kew Bridge railway station is a railway station in Brentford, the London Borough of Hounslow, and is in London fare zone 3. The station and all trains serving it are operated by South Western Railway. The station was named after the nearby Kew Bridge.

== History ==
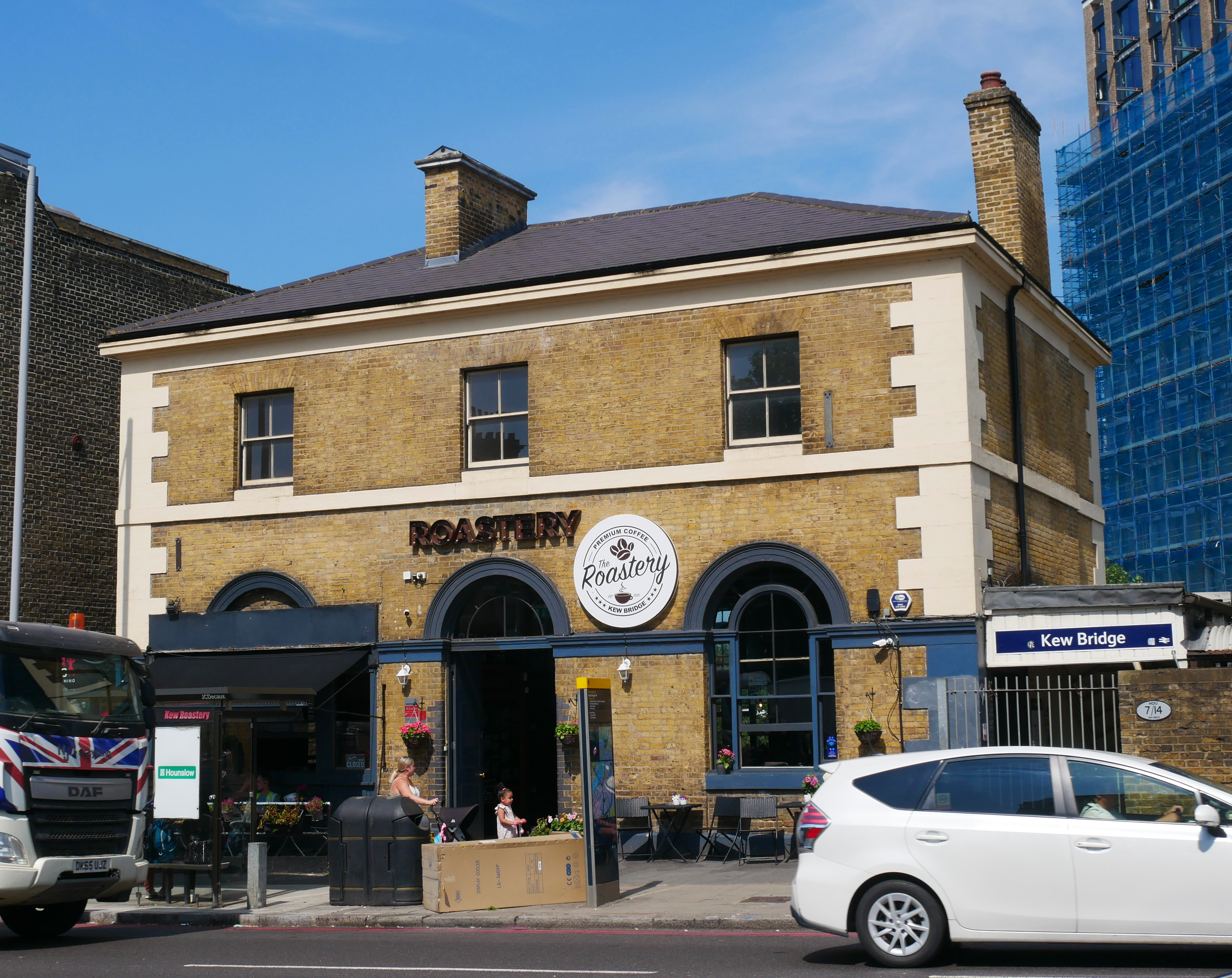
Kew Bridge station building, now a coffee shop. The current entrance is to the right.

The station was built by the Windsor, Staines and South Western Railway (WS&SWR) and was opened on 22 August 1849 by the London and South Western Railway (LSWR), which had absorbed the WS&SWR whilst that railway was under construction. Originally named Kew, it was renamed Kew Bridge on 1 January 1869. The North & South Western Junction Railway in a spirit of affording LSWR access to Fenchurch Street operated its admittedly rival 'Kew' station (1853–1866) on the western curve. From 1862 the companies cooperated: the junction railway company built additional Kew Bridge platforms (which were closed in 1940), the LSWR having constructed the eastern curve itself.

The Grade II listed large station building, designed by Sir William Tite, is now a coffee shop.

Network Rail is planning to build a new footbridge and lifts at the station, as well as a new entrance on the north side, improving access to Brentford Community Stadium.

== Present ==
The station, on the Hounslow Loop Line, is on the southern and eastern curves of the Kew Bridge railway triangle, although the eastern curve platforms are abandoned. The station building was extensively refurbished in June 2013, with the platforms reached by a side walkway.

The station has two active platforms and two disused platforms:

- Platform 2: Trains to Brentford, Hounslow and Weybridge
- Platform 1: Trains to Chiswick, Barnes, Clapham Junction and London Waterloo
- Platform 3: Disused, served trains via South Acton
- Platform 4: Disused, served trains from South Acton continuing via Chiswick.

There are currently no passenger services on the eastern and western curves, but both have been proposed by the London Borough of Hounslow for Crossrail and also for Overground Orbirail.

== Proposals ==
Hounslow Council proposed that Crossrail services from the east have the option of terminating at Hounslow as well as Reading by a mix of existing line and new connections. This proposal was rejected.

Other plans have been drafted and floated to Network Rail for reinstatement of track on the curves and direct services for Brentford Football Club's development of its Lionel Road stadium.

== Services ==
All services at Kew Bridge are operated by South Western Railway.

The typical off-peak service in trains per hour is:

- 2 tph to London Waterloo via Barnes
- 2 tph to Weybridge via Hounslow

Additional services, including trains to and from London Waterloo via Richmond call at the station during the peak hours.

On Sundays, the service is reduced to hourly in each direction and westbound trains run to and from Woking instead of Weybridge.

Preceding station	National Rail	Following station
Chiswick	South Western Railway Hounslow Loop Line	Brentford

== Connections ==
London Buses routes 65, 110, 237, 267, night routes N9 and N65 serve the station.

== See also ==
- Kew Bridge
- Kew
- Royal Botanic Gardens, Kew
- Kew Gardens station (London)
