= Broad Street railway station (England) =

Former railway station in London, England

Broad Street
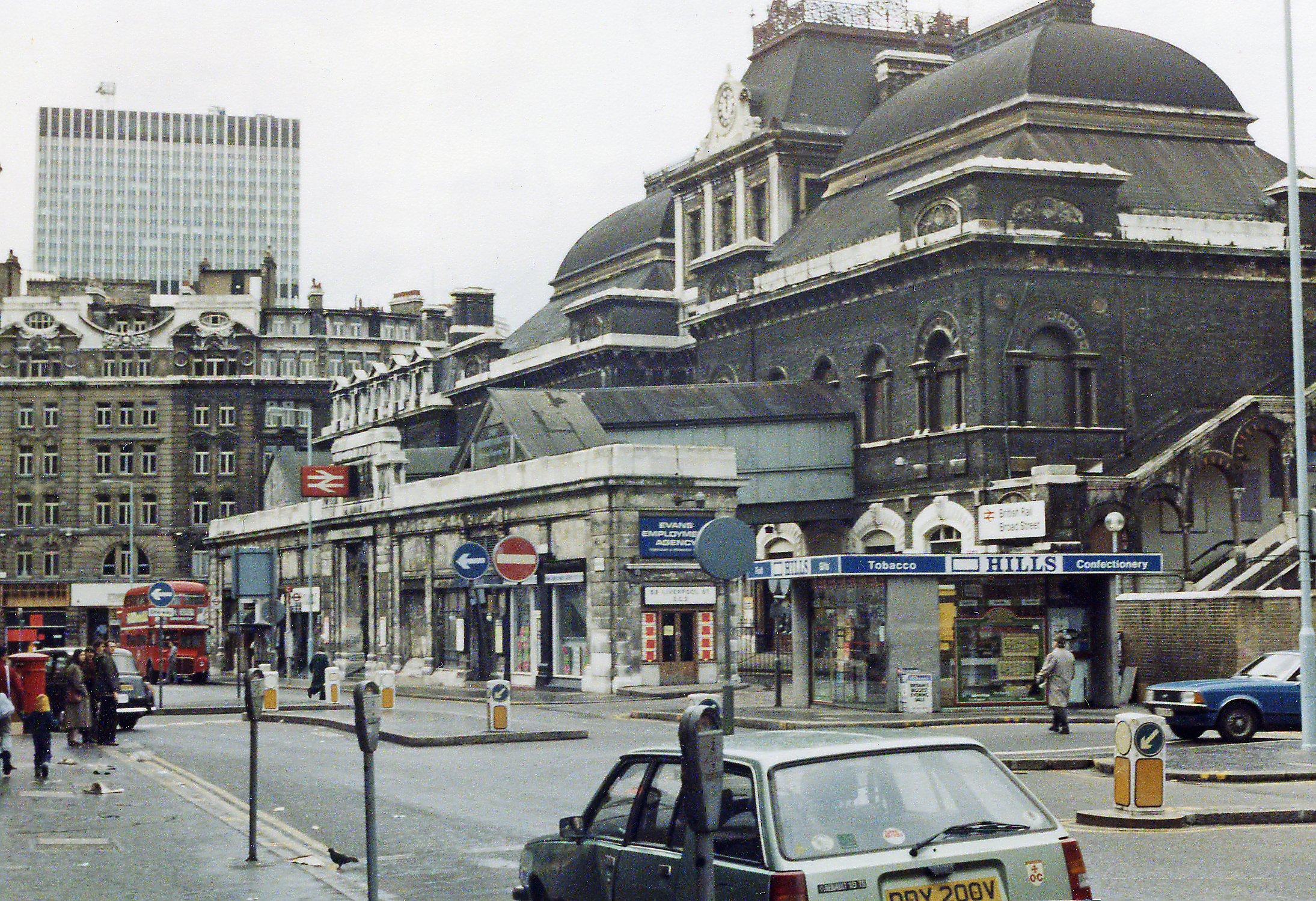
- The station's exterior in April 1983
- Interactive map of Broad Street

General information
- Location: City of London
- Local authority: City of London
- Grid reference: TQ331817
- Number of platforms: 9

Railway companies
- Original company: North London Railway
- Pre-grouping: North London Railway
- Post-grouping: London, Midland and Scottish Railway

Key dates
- 1 November 1865: Opened
- 30 June 1986: Closed
- Replaced by: London Liverpool Street

Other information
- Coordinates: 51.51889°N 0.08333°W

Broad Street was a major railway terminal, adjacent to Liverpool Street station, in the City of London, Greater London, England. It served as the main terminus of the North London Railway (NLR) network between 1865 and 1986.

During its lifetime, it catered for mainly local suburban services around London; over time, it struggled to compete with other modes of transport, leading to its closure. The station was built as a joint venture by the NLR and the London and North Western Railway (LNWR), in order to have a station serving freight closer to the City. It was immediately successful for both goods and passenger services, and saw a significant increase in NLR traffic. Usage peaked in the early 20th century, after which it suffered from competition from London trams, buses and especially the London Underground network. Patronage gradually fell and services decreased, while the building became increasingly dilapidated. Goods services were withdrawn towards the end of the 1960s and the station was closed in 1986. The building was replaced by Broadgate, an office and retail complex, while part of the connecting line to the station was reinstated in 2010 as part of the London Overground.

== Location ==
The station was sited at the junction of New Broad Street, Blomfield Street and Liverpool Street; most of the station was sited in the Bishopsgate Without area of the City of London, with a small part of the north-west of the station in the parish and later borough of Shoreditch. Liverpool Street station was located immediately to the east. A boundary review of 1994 meant that Bishopsgate Without (and, with it, the City of London) gained a large area from the Shoreditch area of the London Borough of Hackney, so that the whole of the former station site is now in the City of London.

The station was sited near to Liverpool Street and Moorgate tube stations.

== History ==
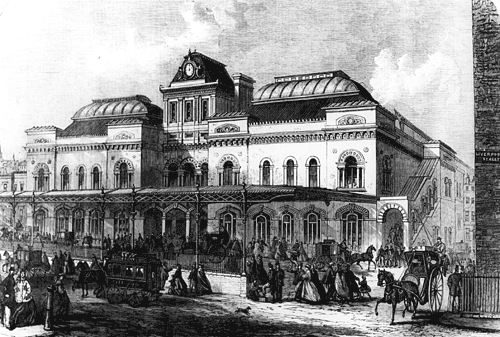
Print of Broad Street as it appeared on opening in 1865

The station was proposed by the North London Railway (NLR). The line originally opened as the East & West India Docks & Birmingham Junction Railway in 1850, in order to transport freight between the London and Birmingham Railway and the London Docklands. By the time it had been renamed to the NLR in 1853, passenger traffic had grown in equal importance, so it was decided to build a station with direct access to the City.

=== Opening ===
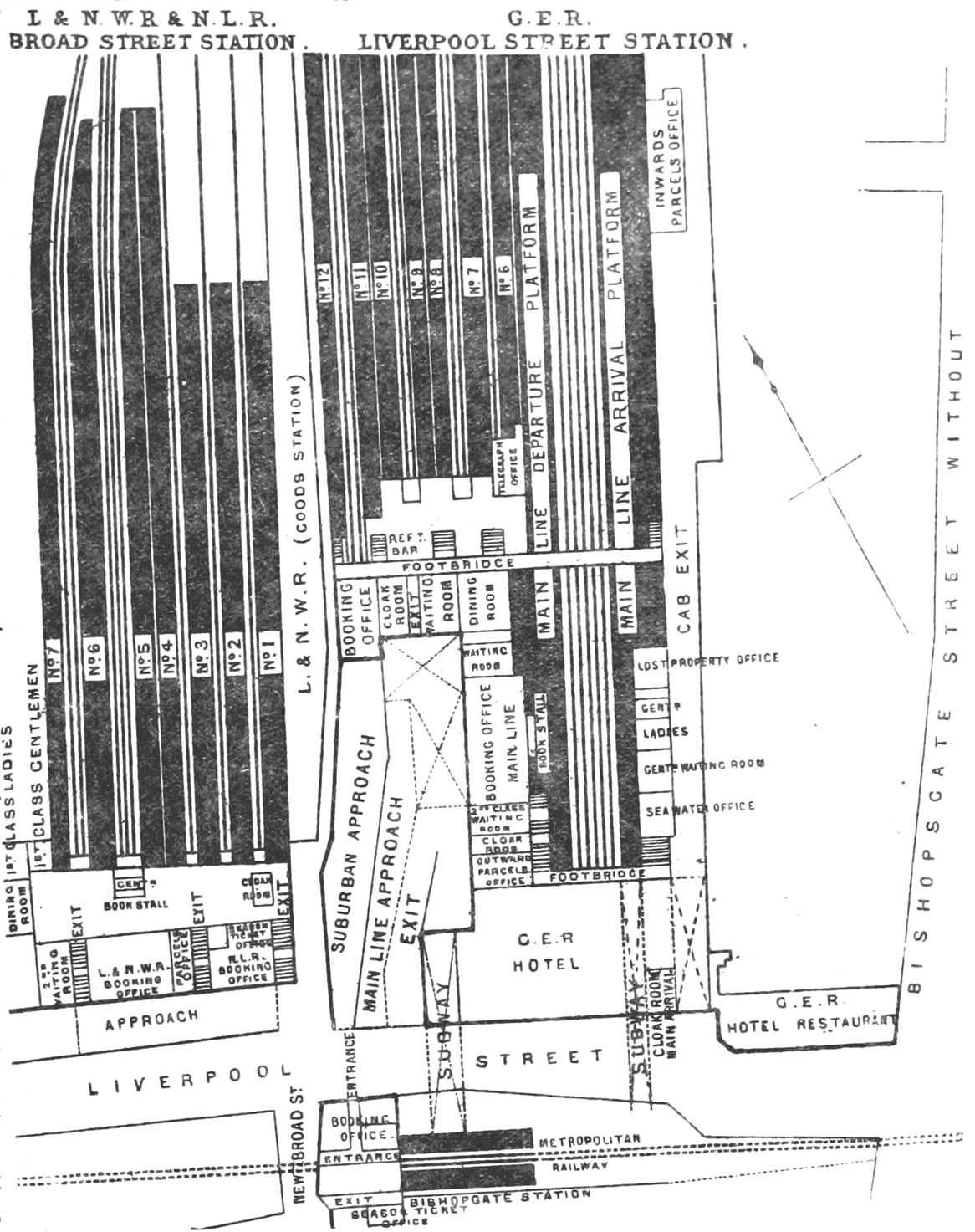
Plan of Broad Street and Liverpool Street stations in 1888

The London and North Western Railway (LNWR) was also keen to have a goods depot in the City, and agreed to help the NLR fund the new extension. The connecting line to Broad Street, via the Kingsland Viaduct, was authorised by the North London Railway (City Branch) Act 1861 (24 & 25 Vict. c. cxcvi) of 22 July 1861. The work involved a 2-mile (3.2 km) extension from Kingsland down towards Broad Street; it required the demolition of numerous properties in Moorfields, Shoreditch and Haggerston. During construction of the terminus, a large burial ground was unearthed, exposing human remains; this may have been a result of the plague or burial pits from Bethlehem Hospital. The overall cost of the station and extension was £1.2m (£130m in 2025).

The station was opened on 1 November 1865, as the terminus of a network of commuter railways linking east and west London via the looping route of the NLR; it had seven platforms originally and three approach tracks. The main building was designed by William Baker and was constructed in an Italianate style and a Second Empire style roof. The frontage was 250 feet (76 m) long and 110 feet (34 m) wide, constructed from white Suffolk brick and Peterhead granite, with a 75-foot (23 m) clock tower as a centrepiece.

Initial services were to Chalk Farm, Bow and Kew, via Hampstead Heath. Services to Watford began on 1 September 1866. Cheap fares for the working class were available from the outset. A goods station was built next to the passenger station, opening to traffic on 18 May 1868. It was constructed on a deck and a hydraulic lift was provided to move wagons down to warehouses below. As a result, the station used only 2.5 acres (1.0 ha) of land, which was convenient owing to the high price of land in the City.

=== Expansion and development ===
Broad Street was an immediate success and caused NLR traffic to double in a short space of time. A fourth approach line was added in 1874, a further (eighth) platform in 1891 and a final (ninth) platform in 1913. Two covered footbridges were added at the front of the main building in 1890 in order to provide direct access from the street to the platforms.

At its peak at the turn of the 20th century, Broad Street was the third-busiest station in London (after Liverpool Street and Victoria). At this time, more than one train per minute arrived or departed Broad Street during rush hour, serving over 27 million passengers in 1902. The Great Northern Railway also used Broad Street as a supplement to its King's Cross terminal to the west. On 1 February 1910, the LNWR introduced a City to City service from Broad Street to Coventry, Birmingham New Street and Wolverhampton. The service only lasted for five years, before being withdrawn on 22 February 1915 as a result of World War I. Nevertheless, the majority of Broad Street's traffic was local suburban services.

=== Decline ===
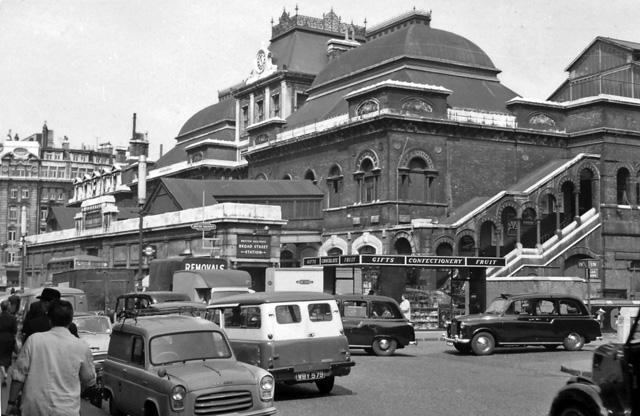
The station in May 1961

In the early years of the 20th century, the North London Line suffered a reduction in passengers and, especially, revenue, owing to the expansion of the bus, tram and Underground networks. In 1909, the NLR passed general handling of trains to the LNWR. By 1913, numbers had dropped to 44.6% compared to 1900, and, by 1921, to only 23.3%; the patronage of Broad Street station declined accordingly. On 8 September 1915, the station was damaged by a Zeppelin attack.

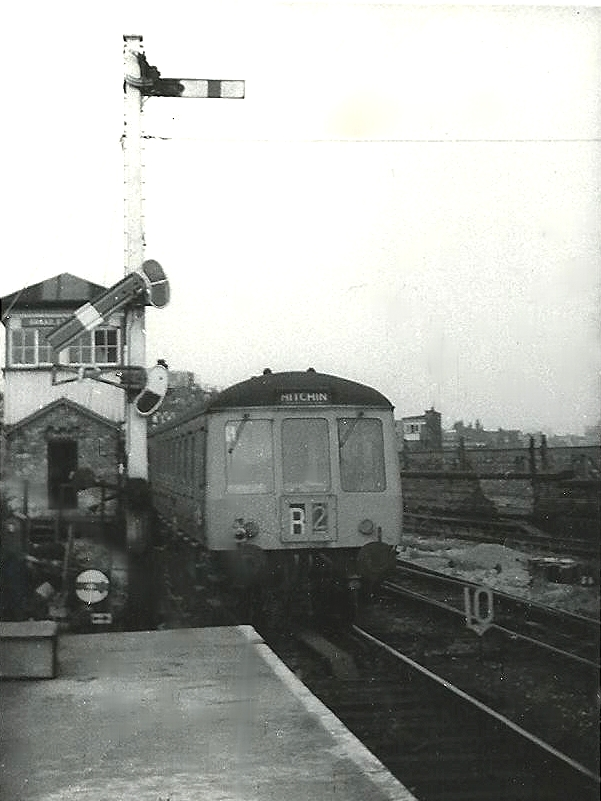
A Class 125 diesel multiple unit departs from Broad Street, with a service to Hitchin (1969)

In the face of the competition, the governing board finally decided to electrify the NLR on the two-conductor-rail at 600 V DC system; electric passenger services started on 1 October 1916, using Oerlikon rolling stock, although the Watford service was not electrified until 10 July 1922. At the terminus, only the western five lines were ever electrified. Electrification appeared to stem the tide of passenger losses. Electric services to Richmond and Kew began on 1 October 1916, followed by peak services to Watford on 16 April 1917; the latter were increased to all-day services on 10 July 1922. By this time, there were four trains per hour to Richmond and two to Watford Junction. Steam services continued to Poplar, with a peak service to Tring. These latter trains continued to use old livery, without modern conveniences such as heating and electric light; they were therefore unpopular.

The station came under the ownership of the London, Midland and Scottish Railway as part of the Big Four grouping in 1923. The former GNR services from Broad Street were stopped completely in 1939, in order to accommodate essential World War II traffic. Broad Street was badly damaged during the war; the lines leading to the station were taken out of action after an overnight raid on 3–4 October 1940, closing the station for a number of days, and similar disruption occurred on 13 October and 11 November. The service to Shoreditch was closed in 1940, while the service to Poplar was withdrawn on 14 May 1944 and never reinstated. A number of peak-season main line trains to Cambridge used Broad Street to take pressure off King's Cross in the early 1950s, but otherwise only a small number of local services remained. The main station building was closed in 1957, after which passengers were directed to a new concourse-level hut at the platform entrance to buy tickets.

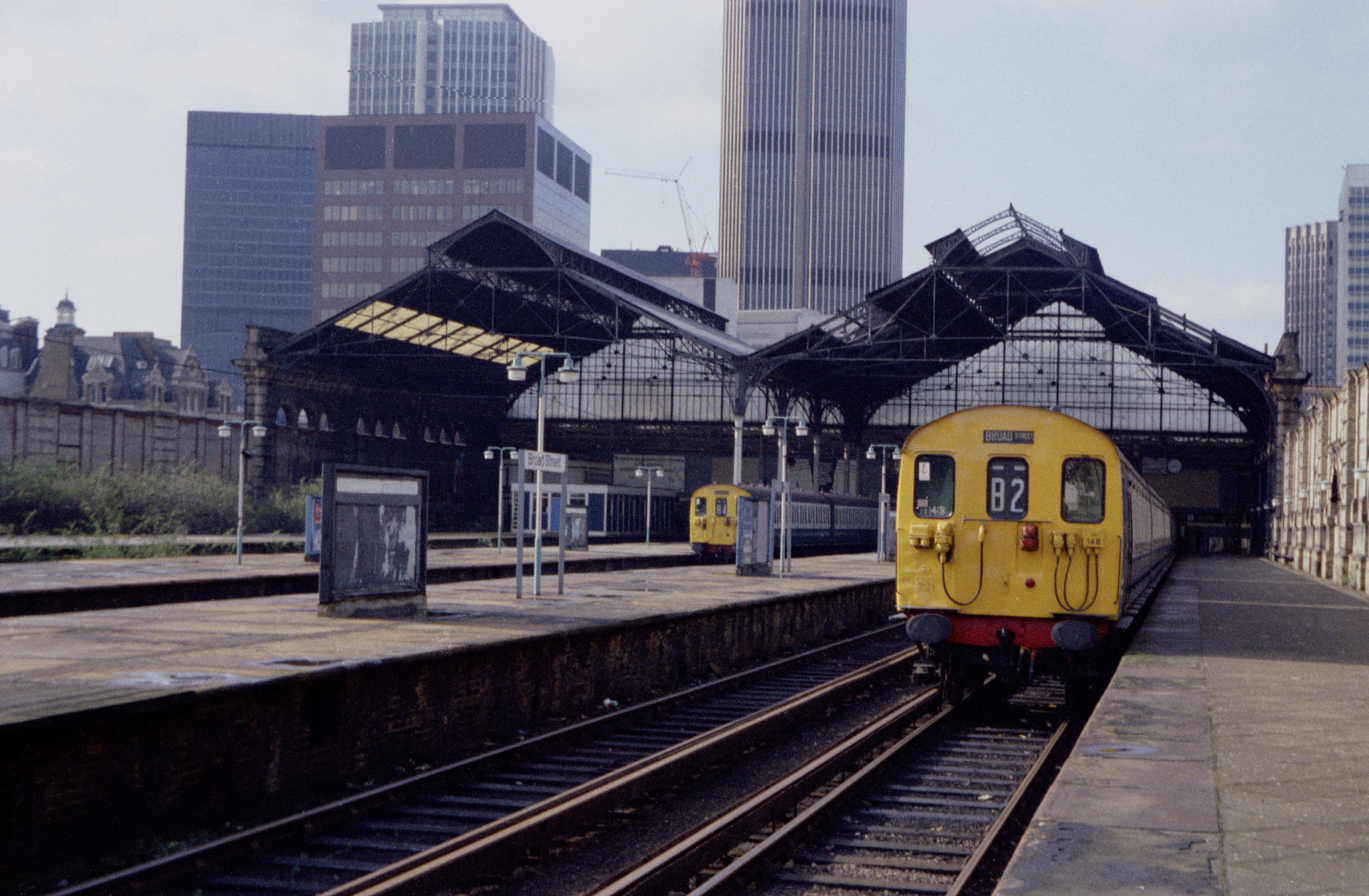
A pair of Class 501s at Broad Street in April 1983

Curving around the north of London before turning south into the City, the North London Line was, for most passengers, a slower route into the financial district than alternative options like taking the underground or changing at Euston or King's Cross. By 1960, only 41 trains carrying 6,400 passengers arrived at Broad Street in the three morning peak hours.

The line and station came in for criticism in the Beeching Report of 1963, whose recommendations resulted in the closing of many branch lines and stations across the country. Though Broad Street itself was not specifically listed for closure, it was earmarked as "stopping passenger services to be modified." The station was gradually run down and the level of service steadily reduced. In 1967, the major part of the train shed was removed, having become unsafe, while goods services were withdrawn on 27 January 1969; four of the nine platforms were taken out of use in the same year. On 6 November 1976, peak-hour services to the Eastern Region, via the Canonbury Spur, were withdrawn with the opening of the Northern City Line; an additional platform was disconnected. The station was by then very dilapidated, with vegetation growing between disused platforms and most of the old goods area was used as a car park.

=== Accidents and incidents ===
- On 3 April 1891, 11 people were injured when a train from Willesden Junction hit the hydraulic buffer stops at Broad Street.
- On 20 September 1898, 15 people were injured when a service from Richmond approaching Broad Street at slightly excessive speed ran into the buffers at the end of platform six. A Board of Trade report on the incident stated: "Fifteen passengers are reported to have complained of bruises or shock, and a few others have claimed compensation for damage to their hats." The train's driver testified: "I committed an error of judgment in not applying the brake quite soon enough."
- On 18 August 1904, a train arriving into a Broad Street platform from Poplar collided with a service waiting to depart for Chalk Farm. Both trains were full and 56 passengers were injured. The Board of Trade investigation reported that "three of the injured had to be taken to hospital, but they were all able to proceed to their homes the same day." Six train crew members also complained of injury. An error on the part of the signaller was determined to be the primary cause of the collision.
- On 20 March 1923, two people were injured when a train was rear-ended at Broad Street.

=== Closure ===
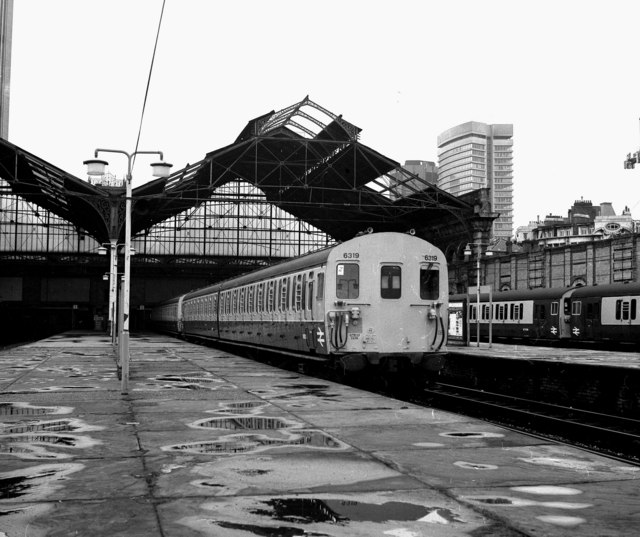
A Class 416 unit stands at Broad Street in March 1985, just prior to the start of demolition

In 1979, British Rail was granted planning permission to completely redevelop Broad Street and Liverpool Street stations; the latter took over the former's few services still remaining. This put Broad Street into a terminal decline. By 1985, 6,000 passengers per week were using Broad Street and 300 arrived daily in the morning peak. From 13 May 1985, the service to Richmond was diverted away from Broad Street, leaving only the peak hour Watford Junction services.

It was agreed that Broad Street would be closed, with trains being diverted to Liverpool Street once a new connecting chord was built from the North London Line. Until this was done, it was possible to accommodate this last service from the outer end of one platform and, in November that year, demolition of the station began. The remaining single platform was used until 27 June 1986. The station was formally closed on 30 June, along with Dalston Junction, the other station serving the North London Line's City branch. Demolition of the station was completed by the end of 1986. The service from Watford to Liverpool Street was withdrawn on 28 September 1992. Primrose Hill, the only station served exclusively by the route from Watford to the City, was closed at the same time.

== Services ==
Preceding station	Disused railways	Following station
Shoreditch; Line and station closed	London and North Western Railway; North London Railway	Terminus
Dalston Junction; Line closed, station open	British Rail; London Midland Region; North London Line (City Branch)	Terminus

== Redevelopment ==
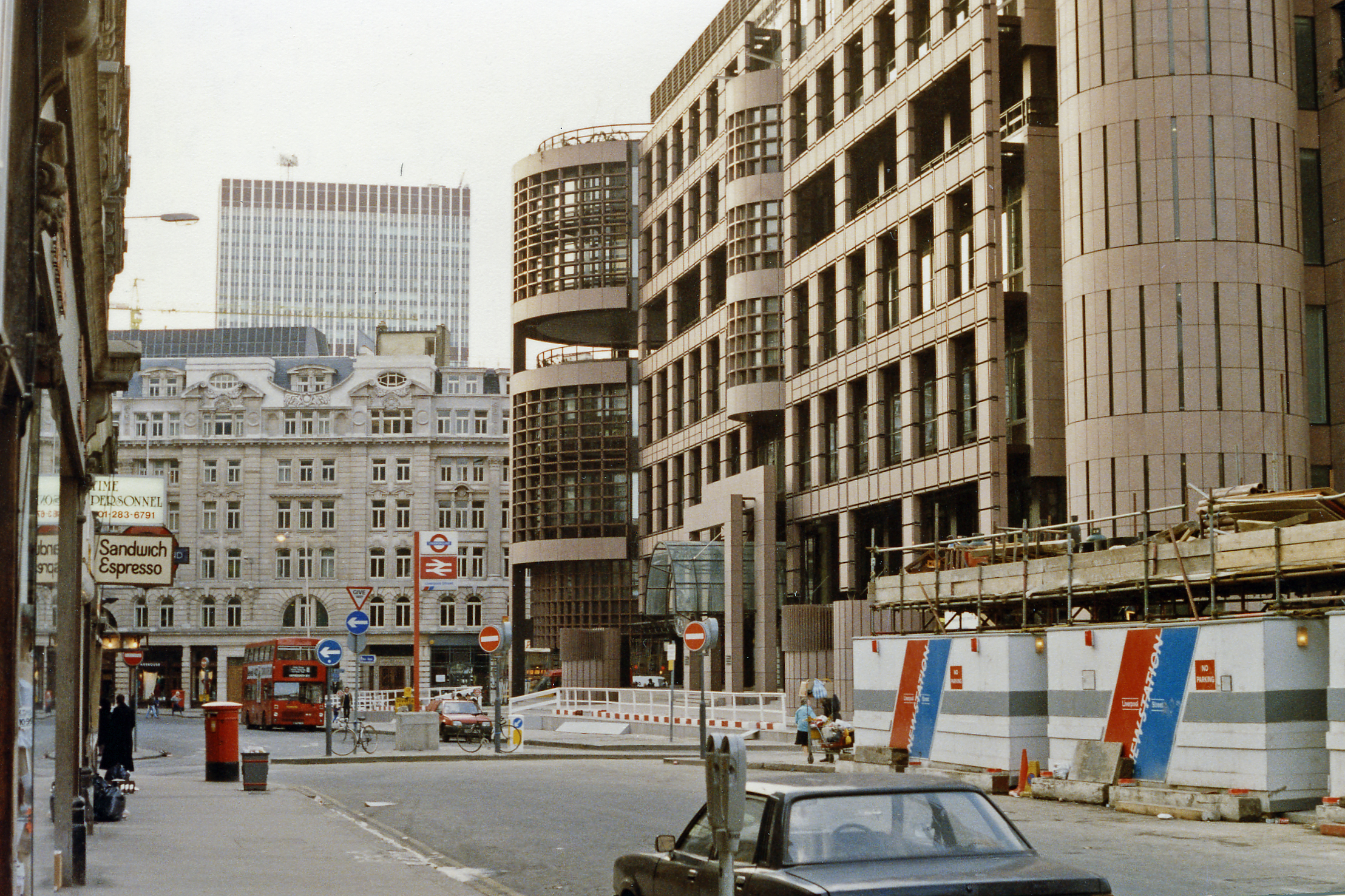
The Broadgate, built on the site of Broad Street, in March 1989

Broad Street station was completely demolished and replaced by the Broadgate office and shopping complex. Most of the Kingsland Viaduct leading to the North London Line remains largely intact, and has been restored to carry the London Overground along the old trackbed as far as Highbury & Islington. The former line over the Great Eastern Street viaduct to Broad Street has been used as a location for artists' studios, housed in converted Jubilee line Underground trains.

The Crossrail project, now called the Elizabeth line, to construct a new underground railway line through central London, has one of its stations at Liverpool Street. A new ticket hall serving the Elizabeth Line station has been built within the old Underground ticket hall with its entrance at 100 Liverpool Street, the old entrance to the Underground that served Broad Street, with the platforms themselves under the Broadgate complex.

A feature of the concourse was the 10-foot-tall (3.0 m) North London Railway war memorial. Made of white marble, it was installed on 10 February 1921, containing inscriptions of 64 names. The memorial commemorated the workers of the North London Railway company who lost their lives in the Great War. Upon closure, the memorial was put in store at Richmond in 1989. On 7 June 2011, it was rededicated outside Hoxton station by Rev James Westcott of St Chad's Church and London's transport commissioner Peter Hendy.

== In popular culture ==
Paul McCartney's 1984 feature film and album of the same name, Give My Regards to Broad Street, makes reference to the station. In one of the last scenes of the film, McCartney walks into the station and sits alone on one of its benches.

Broad Street is the target of an unsuccessful IRA bombing in television spy drama Spooks; although set in 2002, it had been closed 16 years prior. Shots of Marylebone station were used.
