= Kew railway station (England) =

Former railway station in England

Coordinates: 51.4906°N 0.2916°W

Kew

General information
- Location: England
- Platforms: 2

History
- Original company: North and South Western Junction Railway
- Pre-grouping: North and South Western Junction Railway

Key dates
- 1 August 1853: Opened
- 1 February 1862: Closed
Location

Kew railway station was opened by the North and South Western Junction Railway in 1853 in Brentford in west London on the western curve of the Kew triangle. It closed in 1862 after the railway had in 1862 opened its Kew Bridge platforms (closed since 1940) on the eastern curve and which were connected to the LSWR Kew Bridge station, itself on the southern chord. After closure the station buildings remained in situ until the 1950s and the last remains of the platforms were removed in the 1960s.

== Potential reopening ==
West London Orbital proposal which would see reinstatement of the Dudding Hill Line and new stations built at Harlesden and Neasden, a new passenger service will run from Hounslow to Hendon and West Hampstead Thameslink and a new station could be built at Lionel Road as proposed which would be close to the former site of Kew station. The feasibility study stated was a good business case for a station but noted that the station is not required in order to open the line.
