= South Acton railway station (England) =

London Overground station

South Acton
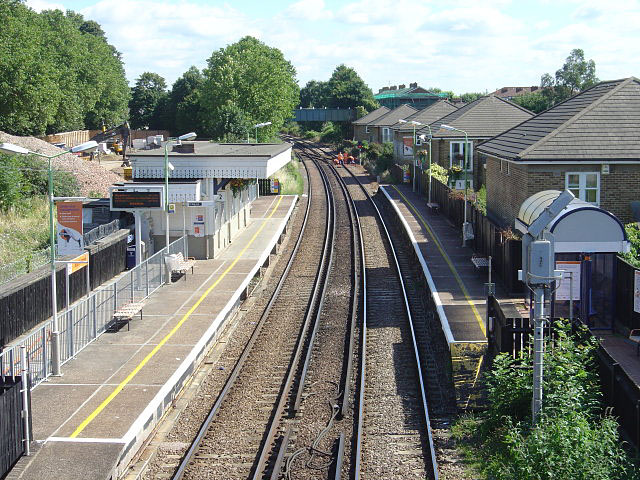
- Interactive map of South Acton

General information
- Location: South Acton
- Local authority: London Borough of Ealing
- Managed by: London Overground
- Owner: Network Rail
- Station code: SAT
- DfT category: E
- Number of platforms: 2
- Accessible: Yes
- Fare zone: 3

National Rail annual entry and exit
- 2020–21: ▼0.263 million
- 2021–22: ▲0.519 million
- 2022–23: ▲0.615 million
- 2023–24: ▲0.705 million
- 2024–25: ▲0.747 million

Key dates
- 1880: Opened

Other information
- External links: Departures; Facilities
- Coordinates: 51.4994°N 0.2707°W

South Acton is a station on the Mildmay line of the London Overground, situated in South Acton in the London Borough of Ealing. It is in London fare zone 3. Until 1959 it was also served by the District line of the London Underground.

== History ==
South Acton station was opened on 1 January 1880 by the North and South Western Junction Railway for North London line trains on the London Broad Street – Richmond line. There was a connecting branch line at South Acton to Hammersmith, renamed Hammersmith and Chiswick from 1 July 1880 and closed from 1 January 1917. There was another branch in the opposite direction from 13 June 1905 to Acton Town, a District Railway service that was withdrawn from 2 March 1959.

== Branch line from Acton Town ==
=== Construction ===
A short spur of the District Railway from Acton Town, 1,232 yards (1,126 metres) long, was authorised by the Metropolitan Railway Act 1874. When first opened, the spur was used for goods trains from 15 May 1899 onwards. Passenger services were introduced on 13 June 1905 to provide an interchange with the North London Railway which ran services from north London to the District Railway's Richmond branch. It thus provided an easier interchange for Richmond for eastbound passengers than changing trains at Turnham Green further east.

=== Operations ===
The South Acton station on the District line of the London Underground was located adjacent to present South Acton station on the North London line on the north-west side of the tracks.

Initially, the line had through passenger services to Hounslow Barracks (now Hounslow West). However, the line was relatively little used and in 1932 the line was reduced to a single track, operated by a one-car shuttle service between Acton Town and South Acton.

In 1933 the railway became part of the London Passenger Transport Board, becoming a branch line of the District line.

Just south of the station before the Bollo Lane level crossing was located a major creamery and milk bottling plant for Express Dairies, which was served by milk trains from both the Great Western Railway and the Southern Railway.

In later years, the shuttle train was normally worked by a single car of London Underground G Stock, specially modified for one person operation and fitted with additional brakes. Given the (then highly unusual) driver-only operation, the branch line was equipped with a two wire emergency telephone system at window level, a feature normally found only in tunnels on the London Underground.

=== Closure ===
The South Acton to Acton Town shuttle last ran on 28 February 1959 and the spur closed as from 2 March 1959. Nothing now remains of the spur, except for a few bridgeheads and sections of the old trackbed, which indicate the route. Currently the rest of station of the same name continues to be well used.

== Branch line to Kew Bridge and Brentford ==
A 2 km-long (1.2 mi) branch exists to Old Kew Junction near Brentford station on the South Western Railway line from Waterloo which does not carry passenger services. There is also another spur from Kew East Jn to Kew Bridge on the line towards Brentford. This comprised part of the North & South Western Junction Railway.

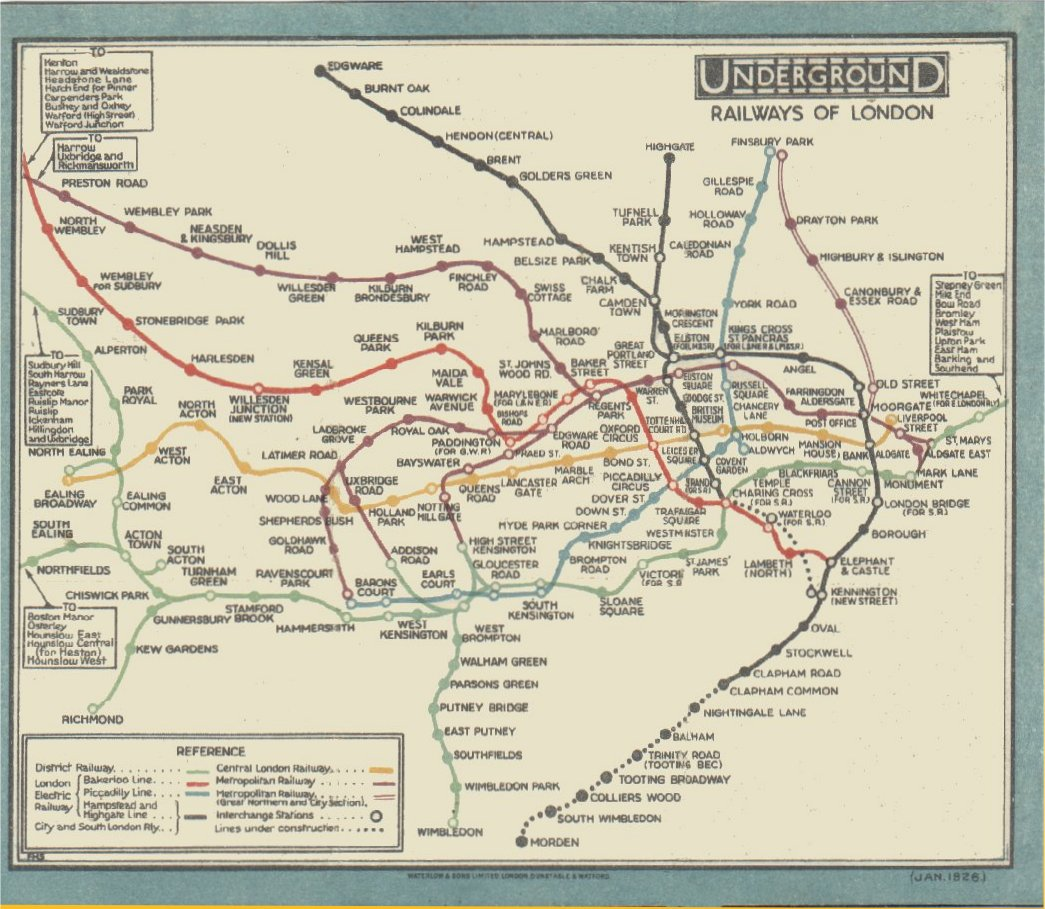
The Acton Town branch line appears on this 1926 Tube map

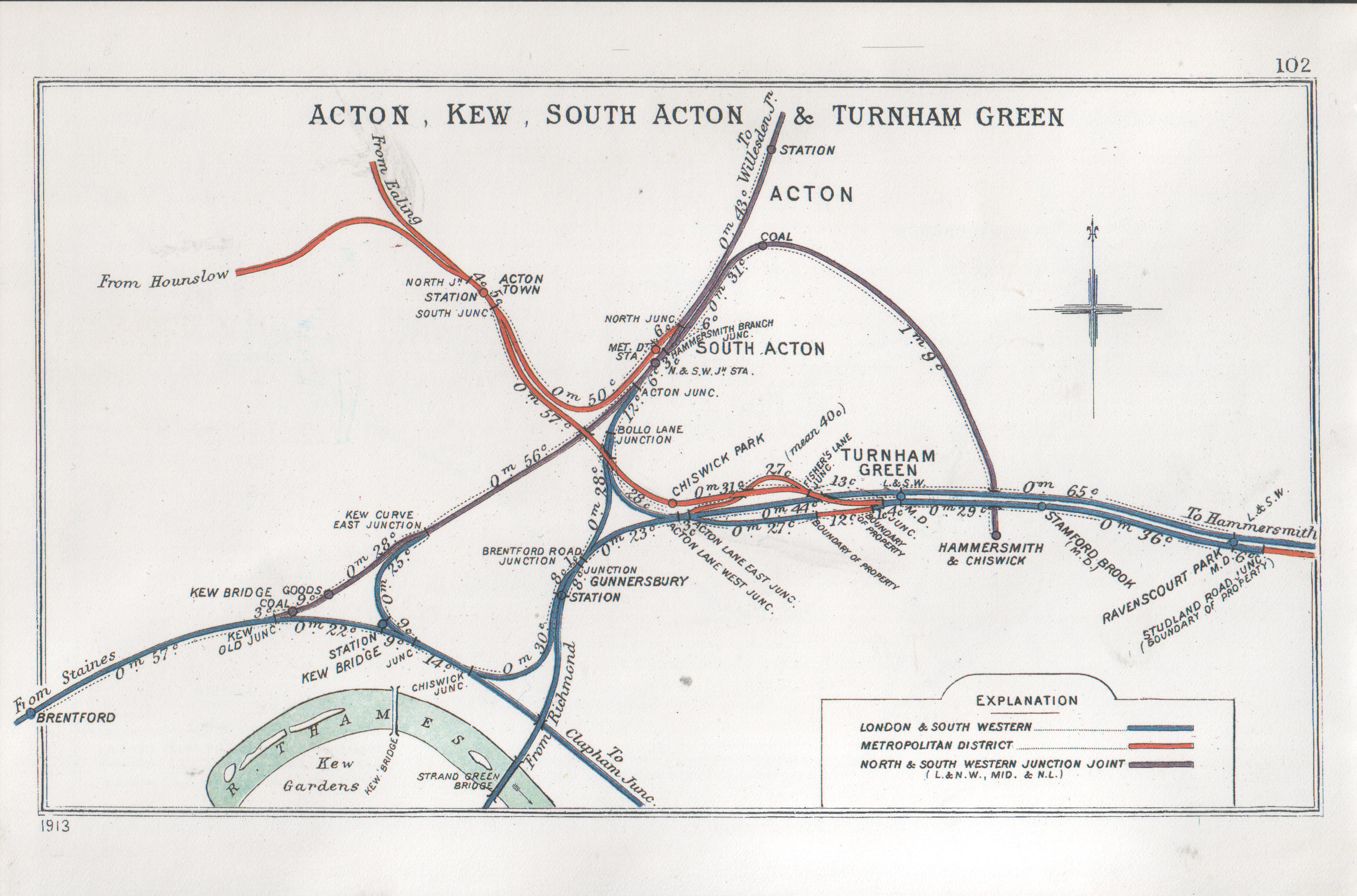
The Acton Town and Kew branch lines shown in detail

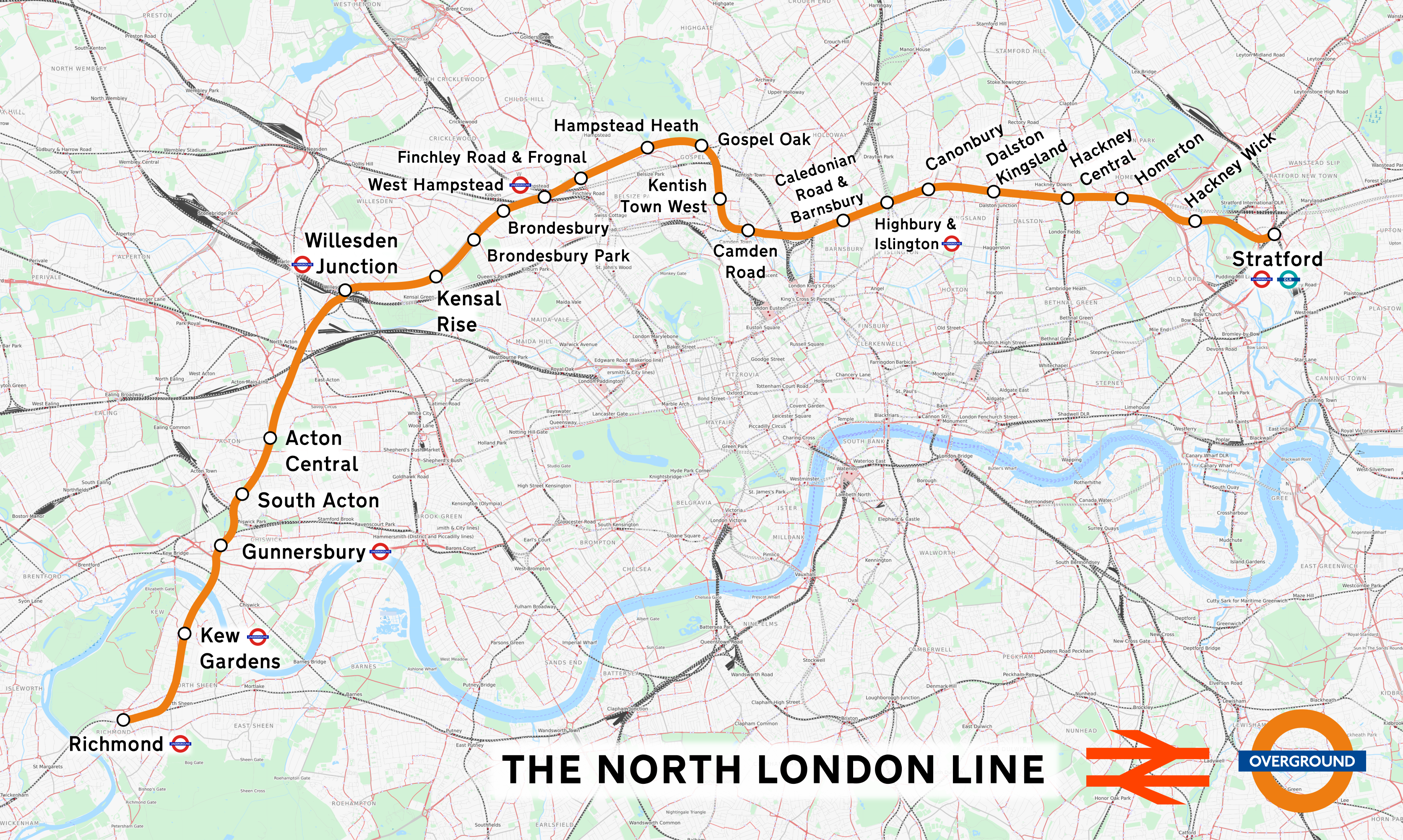
South Acton on the present-day Mildmay line

== Services ==
South Acton currently has the following London Overground (Mildmay line) services, which are operated by Class 378 trains:

Off-peak (daily):

- Four trains per hour to Stratford
- Four trains per hour to Richmond

Preceding station	London Overground	Following station
Gunnersbury towards Richmond	Mildmay line North London line	Acton Central towards Stratford

== Future ==
Transport for London has proposed opening a new West London Orbital line across West London, which would allow London Overground services to run from Brent Cross West, via Old Oak Common and South Acton, to Hounslow.

Preceding station	London Overground	Following station
Gunnersbury towards Richmond	Mildmay line North London line	Acton Central towards Stratford
Disused Railways
Turnham Green; Line closed, station open	Midland Railway; North London Line	Acton Central; Line and station open
Terminus	N&SWJ Railway; Hammersmith branch	Rugby Road; Line and station closed
Preceding station	London Underground	Following station
Acton Town; Line closed, station open	District line South Acton branch (1905–59)	Terminus
