= North and South Western Junction Railway =

Railway line in London, England

Overview
- Locale: London, England
- Dates of operation: 1853–1871
- Successor: Joint ownership: London and North Western Railway, Midland Railway, North London Railway

Technical
- Track gauge: 1,435 mm (4 ft 8 1/2 in) standard gauge

The North and South Western Junction Railway (NSWJR) was a short railway in west London, England. It opened in 1853, connecting Willesden on the London and North Western Railway (LNWR) with Brentford on the London and South Western Railway (LSWR). After a difficult start it became an important freight route and that usage continues today. A passenger service linked LSWR stations with the North London Railway, and a branch was built to Hammersmith.

Part of the original main line survives between South Acton Junction and a point near Willesden Junction. It carries the heavily used Richmond to Stratford passenger service, and the whole of the main line remains an important freight connection. However, the Hammersmith branch has closed and no regular passenger service remains on the southern section of the main line.

== Planning and construction ==
North and South Western Junction Railway Act 1851
- Act of Parliament
- Parliament of the United Kingdom
- Long title: An Act for making a Railway from the Loop Line of the Windsor, Staines, and South-western (Richmond to Windsor) Railway, in the Parish of Ealing in the County of Middlesex to the London and North-western Railway in the Parish of Hammersmith in the said County, with a Branch, to be called "The North and South Western Junction Railway."
- Citation: 14 & 15 Vict. c. c)

Dates
- Royal assent: 24 July 1851
Other legislation
Repealed by	North and South Western Junction Railway Act 1853

Status: Repealed

Text of statute as originally enacted

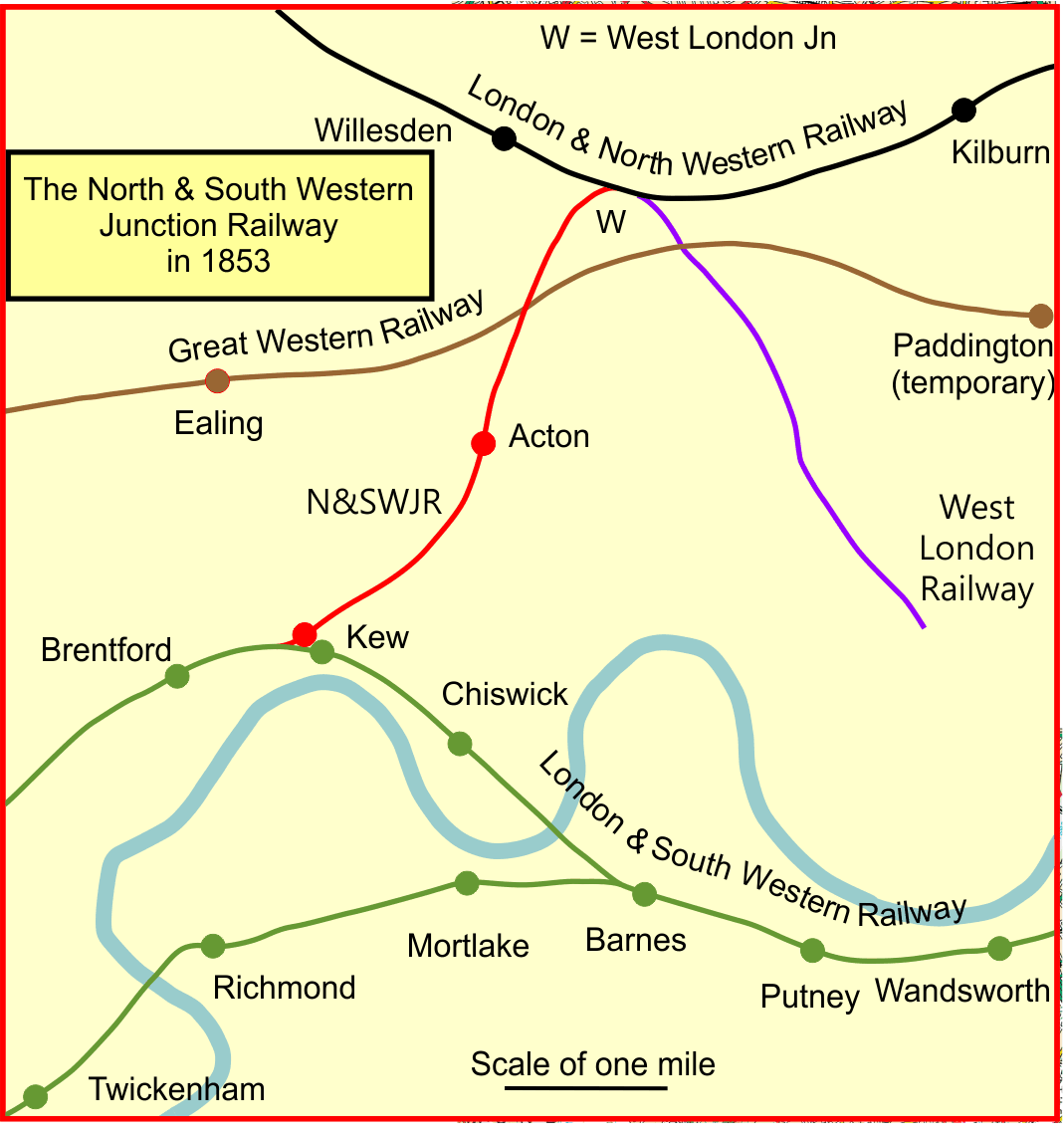
Map of the N&SWJR system in 1853

The proximity of the unconnected LNWR and LSWR railways immediately west of London led to a number of failed schemes, until in 1851 the North and South Western Junction Railway (N&SWJR) obtained its authorising act of Parliament, the North and South Western Junction Railway Act 1851 (14 & 15 Vict. c. c) for a 4 1/2 mile line (Note: The actual route length now is from 0 m 00 ch at Willesden to "Route Boundary" at Kew Old Jn, at 3 m 39 ch according to the Kent Wessex Sussex Sectional Appendix, 2009, issued by Network Rail; "Route Boundary" may be a few chains short of the actual point of junction; Williams (p 176) says 3 miles 5 furlongs, i.e. 3 m 50 ch, which seems right; the authorising act may have included sidings at Willesden.) from Willesden (N&SW Junction, near West London Junction), to Brentford (actually Kew Junction, later renamed Old Kew Junction).

The little company had understood that the line would be worked by the LSWR and the London and North Western Railway (LNWR) jointly, but when the line was complete, those companies were reluctant to provide train services. Williams suggests that this was to protect existing road cartage business across London. A goods service was started on 15 February 1853, nine months after being passed as fit by the Board of Trade Inspector. Passenger traffic started on 1 August 1853: four North London Railway trains daily ran from Hampstead Road (with a connection there from Fenchurch Street) to Kew; the N&SWJR had its own station there just short of the LSWR line—a temporary platform at first; there was an intermediate station at Acton.

Disregarding the hostility of the LSWR, the N&SWJR pressed to run through to Windsor, and three additional trains ran from Hampstead Road to Windsor started on 1 June 1854; the journey time from Fenchurch Street, changing at Hampstead Road, was two hours. The service lasted until October 1854 only.

== Branches ==
=== Hammersmith ===
North and South Western Junction Railway Act 1853
- Act of Parliament
- Parliament of the United Kingdom
- Long title: An Act for enabling the North and South Western Junction Railway Company to construct a Branch to near Hammersmith, and to raise additional Capital; and for other Purposes.
- Citation: 16 & 17 Vict. c. lxix

Dates
- Royal assent: 28 June 1853

Text of statute as originally enacted

North and South Western Junction Railway Act 1854
- Act of Parliament
- Parliament of the United Kingdom
- Long title: An Act for enabling the North and South Western Junction Railway Company to raise additional Capital; and for other Purposes.
- Citation: 17 & 18 Vict. c. cxli

Dates
- Royal assent: 10 July 1854

Text of statute as originally enacted

North and South Western Junction Railway Act 1864
- Act of Parliament
- Parliament of the United Kingdom
- Long title: An Act for authorizing the North and South Western Junction Railway Company to acquire additional Lands for the Purposes of their Undertaking; and to raise further Monies; and for other Purposes.
- Citation: 27 & 28 Vict. c. cxiii

Dates
- Royal assent: 23 June 1864

Text of statute as originally enacted

North and South Western Junction Railway Act 1868
- Act of Parliament
- Parliament of the United Kingdom
- Long title: An Act for authorizing the North and South Western Junction Railway Company to make a Deviation or Alteration in their Main Line of Railway; to raise further Monies; and for other Purposes.
- Citation: 31 & 32 Vict. c. l

Dates
- Royal assent: 25 June 1868

Text of statute as originally enacted

Continuing to enter territory that the LSWR considered its own, the N&SWJR got authority in the North and South Western Junction Railway Act 1853 (16 & 17 Vict. c. lxix) to make a branch to the small rural town of Hammersmith, although the terminus was some distance west of the place. The purpose of the branch is not clear as the area was still undeveloped, and a shareholders' committee found that the directors had improperly arranged construction outside the authorised capital of the company.

The junction with the N&SWJR main line, at Acton Gatehouse Junction, faced Kew and it may be that the directors hoped that the LSWR would work the branch passenger trains. Goods trains started working to the terminus on 1 May 1857, but the main line companies were reluctant to operate a passenger service, and the N&SWJR itself acquired a Sharp, Stewart 0-4-0 saddle tank locomotive. This made nine return journeys daily, and five on Sundays, to the junction. There was no station there, but the branch coaches were attached to and detached from North London trains. This arrangement started on 8 April 1858; the best journey time to Fenchurch Street was 55 minutes.

The branch was not commercially successful, and when the Hammersmith and City Railway opened in 1864, it provided faster services to Central London from a more convenient Hammersmith location, and the N&SWJR branch suffered further. Goods traffic too was handled more conveniently at locations on other lines.

From 1 November 1865, the system of coupling and uncoupling at Gatehouse Junction was ended; instead the branch coaches ran through to Acton station (now Acton Central). As that station was north of the south-facing junction, this involved reversal there, and trains to the branch were propelled from Acton to the junction.

=== Richmond ===
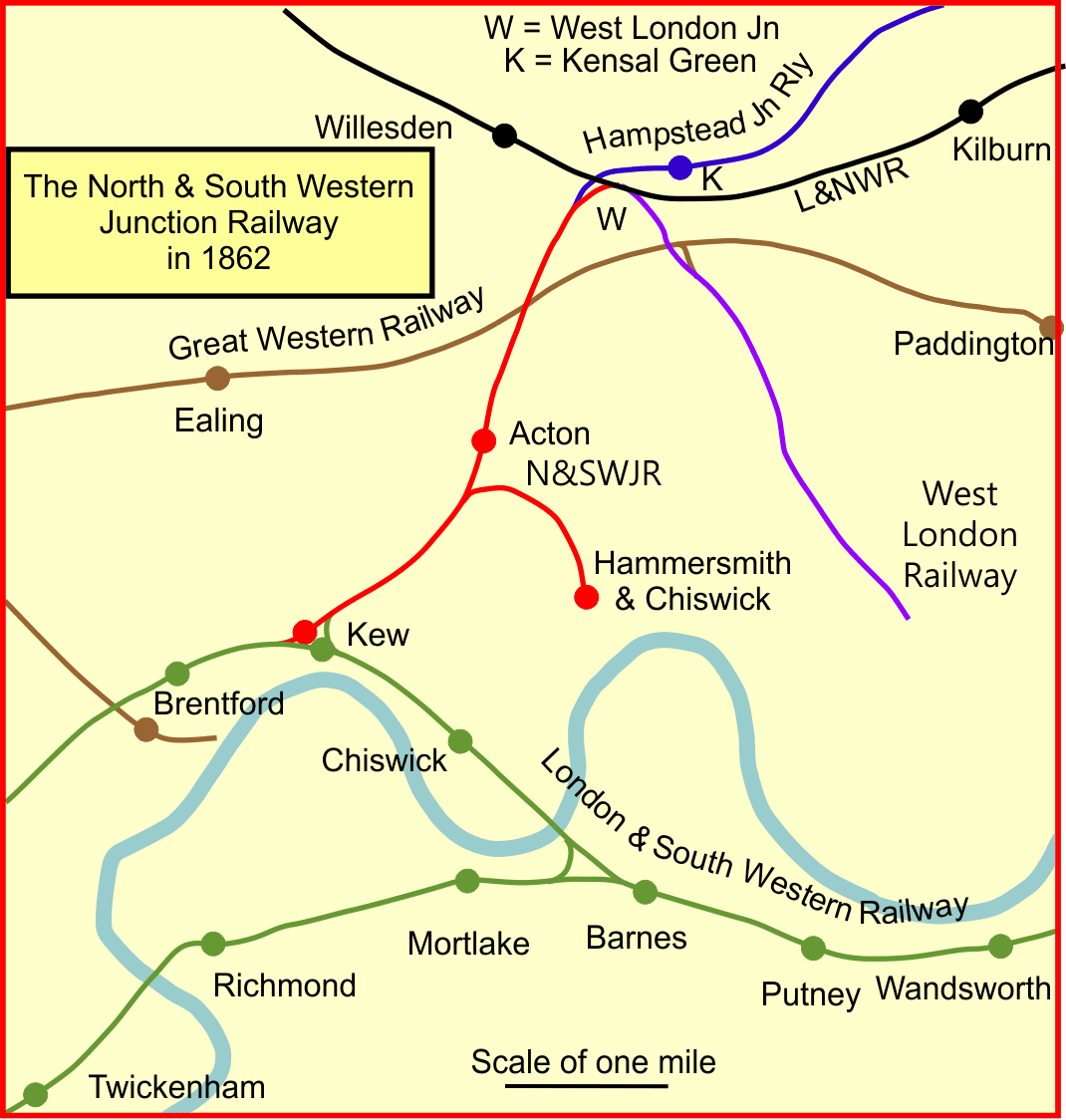
Map of the N&SWJR in 1862

Turning up the heat even further, the N&SWJR flirted with the idea of an extension to Richmond, and this gained considerable support but failed in Parliament. Feeling itself under pressure, the LSWR arranged with the N&SWJR to run a Twickenham—Richmond—Hampstead Road service, reversing at Barnes and again at Kew; some LSWR coaches apparently worked through to Fenchurch Street. The service started on 20 May 1858.

The two reversals were obviously extremely inconvenient, and the LSWR, warming to the N&SWJR, obtained powers to build an east curve at Kew and a west curve at Barnes; they opened on 1 February 1862. Williams points out that the passenger timings hardly improved, the Kew Junction to Richmond times reducing from 19 minutes to 16 minutes. At the same time, some passenger trains continued to call at the original N&SWJR station at Kew until October 1866.

The original junction with the LSWR had been Kew Junction, and it was now renamed Old Kew Junction, with the new east-facing junction being New Kew Junction. The LSWR had its Kew station just west of the point of junction, and it built adjacent platforms on the new curve. (Kew station was later renamed Kew Bridge).

== Services ==
After opening in 1853 the main line was operated by the North London Railway (NLR). From 1865 Broad Street in the City of London was the most important passenger station connected to the line. From 1864 some trains went on to Kingston. The line between Willesden and Richmond carried services to and from Broad Street and was used by other companies serving Richmond. In 1869 the LSWR opened the direct connecting line from South Acton to Richmond via Gunnersbury and services west beyond Richmond ceased.

In 1868 Kew station (LSWR) was renamed Kew Bridge, and the following year the LSWR opened a line from Richmond through Gunnersbury (at first called "Brentford Road") passing Turnham Green and Hammersmith. This gave a considerable boost to Richmond traffic, which was carried over the N&SWJR between Acton Junction (at the site of the later South Acton station) and Old Oak Junction, where the Hampstead Junction Railway connected. The Richmond line generated a more frequent train service on what is now the North London Line.

North and South Western Junction Railway Act 1871
- Act of Parliament
- Parliament of the United Kingdom
- Long title: An Act for confirming an Agreement for a Lease of the undertaking of the North and South Western Junction Railway Company; and for other purposes.
- Citation: 34 & 35 Vict. c. cxcii

Dates
- Royal assent: 14 August 1871

Text of statute as originally enacted

The N&SWJR had been worked by the North London Railway, the Midland Railway and the LNWR jointly since its beginning. Under the North and South Western Junction Railway Act 1871 (34 & 35 Vict. c. cxcii) the line was taken over by those companies jointly.

In 1874 the Metropolitan District Railway ran through trains along the LSWR alignment to the West End of London and the City. The GWR, in 1870, had already operated a service via Hammersmith Grove Road onto the Metropolitan Railway tracks, but this was withdrawn after a few months.

In an attempt to staunch the loss of business, the N&SWJR opened a new station at South Acton on 1 January 1880, renaming the Hammersmith station Hammersmith & Chiswick. The new South Acton station had a bay for the Hammersmith branch line, which was extended to run independently alongside the main line for 19 chains to reach the station. Acton and South Acton, and the earlier Kew, were the only stations on the N&SWJR main line.

The 1895 Bradshaw's Guide shows a half-hourly service on the branch, but still changing trains to get to London. Quite apart from tramway competition, there were now several competing railways in the area: as well as the Hammersmith and City and the Metropolitan District Railway, the LSWR itself ran a service from Richmond via Hammersmith (Grove Road), alternately to Waterloo and Ludgate Hill via Kensington and Loughborough Junction.

The LNWR took over the operation of the North London Railway on 1 January 1909 and replaced the passenger trains on the Hammersmith branch with a 48-seat steam railmotor; this operated a half-hourly service from 4 January 1909. Responding to competition from street tramways, three new halts were opened on the branch, at Bath Road, Woodstock Road and Rugby Road. On 9 March 1913 the steam car was replaced by a petrol-electric railmotor, LNWR No. 9.

The competing transport methods intensified and the branch was hopelessly uneconomic. The passenger service was withdrawn on 1 January 1917. Goods trains continued to serve a coal depot and asphalt plant at Hammersmith until 2 May 1965, after which the branch finally closed.

The LNWR electrified the N&SWJR main line to both Richmond and Kew Bridge in 1916, on the fourth rail d.c. system. This provided a more frequent and pleasanter travel experience and was very successful.

The passenger service to Kew Bridge ended in 1940. After Broad Street closed in 1986 the N&SWJR line carried North London Line services between Richmond and North Woolwich in east London.

== Current usage ==
The N&SWJR main line continues in use as a freight route from the former LNWR line at Willesden and the Hampstead Junction line to the Hampshire area via Hounslow and Chertsey. The section from Old Oak Junction (near Willesden Junction) to South Acton carries the intensive North London line passenger service. The Hammersmith branch has long since been built over, but remains very easy to trace until south of the Bath Road, where the 'level' crossing hump is still very clearly evident.

In June 2013, the Mayor of London and the London Boroughs of Brent, Ealing and Hammersmith & Fulham released 'vision' consultation documents about the Old Oak Common area of west London. This involves a major development area for London, based around a new Old Oak Common railway station for High Speed 2 and Great Western Main Line, including Crossrail. The vision mentions a new branch of the London Overground system, connecting Old Oak to Hounslow, via Kew Bridge.

== Death of Sergey Stepnyak-Kravchinsky ==
On 23 December 1895 the Ukrainian exile and anarchist Sergey Stepnyak-Kravchinsky (usually known as Stepniak) was killed by a train on the Hammersmith branch at Woodstock Road; there was a pedestrian crossing there, and the site later became the Woodstock Road station. He was walking from his house in Woodstock Road to resume a conference in Shepherds Bush, a moderately short walk. Climbing the stile at the crossing, he seems not to have heard the approaching North London Railway passenger train, and he was run over by it and died of injuries. The following day the Times newspaper reported

The accident took place between 10 and 11 o’clock in the morning at a point about three-quarters of a mile north of the Hammersmith and Chiswick terminus of [the N&SWJR]. M. Stepniak left his house in Woodstock-road, Bedford-park in order to resume a conference ... with a number of his associates in Russian propaganda work at the house of his chief colleague, M. Felix Volkhovsky. M. Volkhovsky lives in Shepherd’s-bush, a walk of only a few minutes from Bedford-park. Woodstock-road runs northward to the railway, and crosses it at a level crossing. M. Stepniak ... was caught by the engine of a train which was travelling in the direction of Acton, knocked on to the line, and dragged some yards along it. When the train was stopped the body was found to be very much mutilated.

It is stated that the driver noticed a man on the rails, and blew his whistle, but M. Stepniak, whether he heard it or not, took no notice of the warning.

In her diary, Olive Garnett claimed a plausible 28 mph for the train speed.

The inquest found accidental death; the evidence added some minor details: the train left Chiswick for Acton at 10.20. The driver was a North London Railway man. In evidence, the Traffic Superintendent of the NLR said that the line was leased from the original N&SWJR by a joint committee of the Midland, LNW and North London Railways, and was worked by the NLR.

Many books of recollections misreport several details: several state that the accident took place at the Bath Road level crossing; Reid, claiming that Stepniak was visiting Lucien Pissarro, son of the painter, even includes a photograph of the crossing, but it was gated and staffed at the time, and there was a footbridge. (Note: Clearly visible on large scale Ordnance Survey maps of the time; part of the footbridge appears in one of Pissarro Senior's paintings, reproduced in Reid's book.)

These errors are repeated anecdotally by Hermynia zur Mühlen and several other derivative works.
