= Kensington and Richmond line of the LSWR =

Railway line in West London

The Kensington and Richmond line was a railway in West London, England. It was built by the London and South Western Railway (LSWR), which already had a main line to Richmond from London. The Kensington line was chiefly a defensive measure to limit the incursion of rival railways into LSWR territory. It ran from Kensington on the West London Railway, by way of Hammersmith, Turnham Green, Gunnersbury and Kew; it opened in 1869. It had a separate station at Richmond, in keeping with the LSWR intention of preventing competitors from easily obtaining running powers to go further into the LSWR area.

Nevertheless, several competing companies ran passenger train services into Richmond over part of the line, and the Midland Railway developed an important route for the supply of house coal to the developing suburbs served. In 1877 the Metropolitan District Railway connected to the Kensington line at Hammersmith, and ran an increasingly intensive passenger service to Richmond. From 1879 the District operated to Ealing, and soon the volume of its train service swamped the capacity of the shared route section, from near Hammersmith to Turnham Green. When the District Railway electrified its train services in 1905, it was obvious that line capacity was overwhelmed, and the line was quadrupled from 1911, the District Railway being allocated a dedicated double track.

The LSWR had almost exclusive use of the other double track, but its own service, now seen by the public as inferior, was declining steeply, and in 1916 it was withdrawn completely. The LSWR pair of tracks remained dormant for ten years, until in 1926 the District Railway implemented a widening scheme. By taking the ground formerly occupied by the LSWR, the District Railway, now part of the Underground system, was able to quadruple its own tracks. This was operational from 1932, with the Piccadilly Line operating fast services on the centre two tracks and the District Line working stopping trains on the outer pair. This applied between Hammersmith (at the former Studland Road Junction) and Turnham Green. From Studland Road Junction to Kensington was now derelict and the land was sold. From Turnham Green to Richmond, the line continued, but was now used by the District Line trains and the North London Line trains from Broad Street, later from North Woolwich.

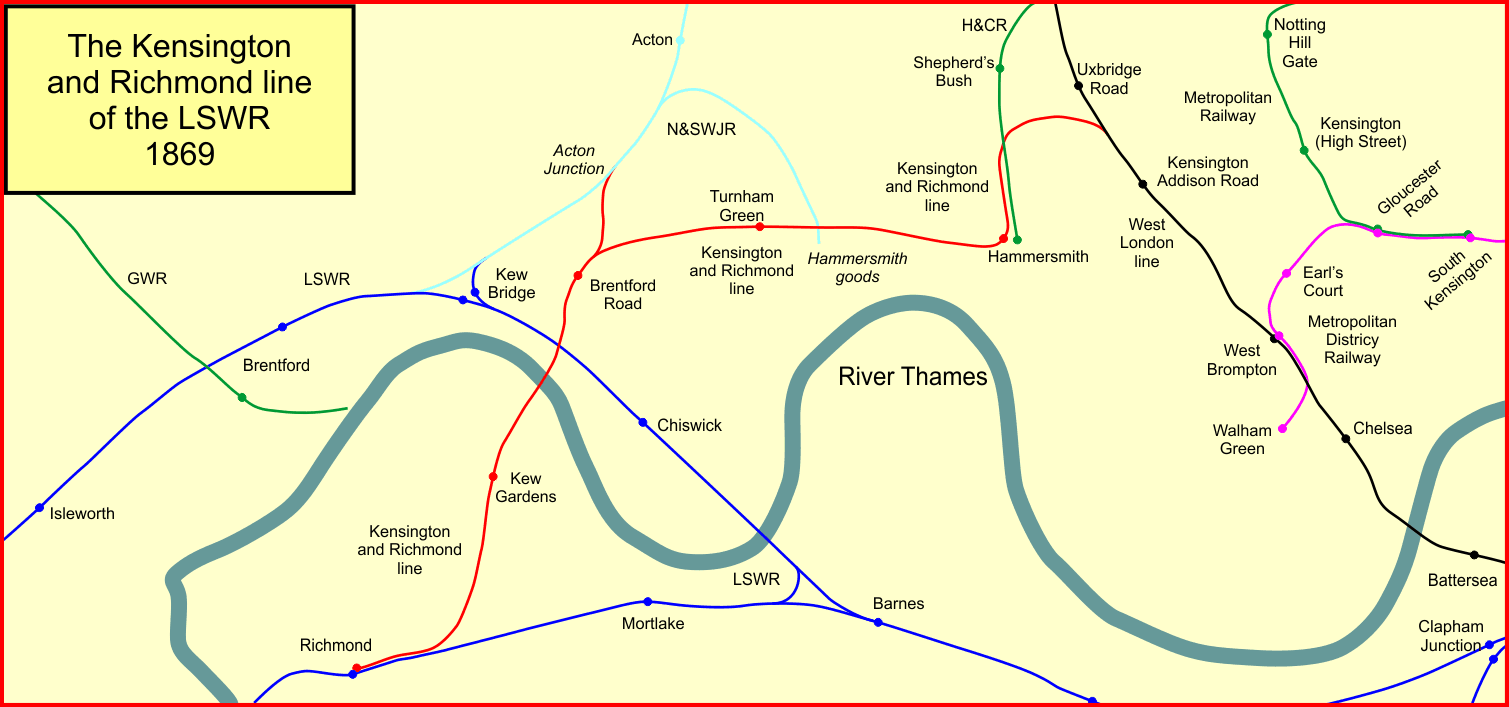
The Kensington and Richmond line in 1869

== History ==
=== Richmond as a residential centre ===
Richmond had long had royal connections and in the 19th century, Richmond became increasingly desirable as a residential town. The amenities available for the well-to-do made it attractive, and travel to the City of London by steamer made it attractive as a rural retreat.

Richmond gained a railway connection in 1846 when the Richmond Railway reached the town, giving a quick connection to London. At first this was the Nine Elms terminus, but Waterloo became the London station from 1848. The Richmond Railway was taken over by the London and South Western Railway in 1847. The railway accelerated the establishment of an affluent class of professional people living in the area served, and in turn this attracted the LSWR's railway competitors to consider participating in the business of residential travel. The urge was enhanced by the LSWR's continuing difficulty in getting to the City of London: in a daily journey of twelve miles, the last two miles from Waterloo were far more time-consuming, and more aggravating than the first part of the journey.

=== Competing railways ===
The North and South Western Junction Railway (N&SWJR) was connected from Willesden on the London and North Western Railway (LNWR) to Kew, on the LSWR's Hounslow loop line, in 1853. It wanted to advance to Richmond, and the LSWR feared that Parliament would support that if the LSWR did nothing to facilitate the connection. Not wanting the N&SWJR to have its own entry to Richmond, the LSWR constructed curves at Kew and Barnes, opening in 1862, enabling the N&SWJR trains to reach Richmond over LSWR track. The route was very circuitous. Although the trains ran, this was clearly unsatisfactory and the pressure to get direct access to Richmond continued. The N&SWJR decided to promote its own line from Kew Bridge to Richmond; the LSWR was alarmed at this possibility and persuaded the N&SWJR that it would build such a line itself, providing connections and running powers for the N&SWJR, and the other companies that used N&SWJR track.

The LSWR formulated a Kensington and Richmond Railway. It would make a six-mile line from near Kensington (Addison Road) station on the West London Railway, through Shepherd's Bush and Hammersmith, and the N&SWJR would join it south of Acton; the line would cross the River Thames on a new bridge and run to a separate terminus alongside the existing Richmond station. By running the line to a terminal station, the LSWR intended to restrict the incursion of rival railways to Richmond only, and discourage the granting of running powers to go further west.

=== LSWR Kensington and Richmond line ===
London and South-western (Kensington and Richmond) Railway Act 1864
- Act of Parliament
- Parliament of the United Kingdom
- Long title: An Act for authorizing the London and South-western Railway Company to make and maintain a Line of Railway from Kensington to Richmond, and Junction Lines communicating with the Hammersmith and City Railway and the North and South Western Junction Railway respectively; and to raise further Monies; and for authorizing Arrangements with divers Railway Companies; and for other Purposes.
- Citation: 27 & 28 Vict. c. clxvi

Dates
- Royal assent: 14 July 1864

Text of statute as originally enacted

The LNWR, as the most assertive member of the West London Railway's joint owners, had negative feelings about the limitation to terminating at Richmond, but acquiesced in the face of other potential threats. The LSWR parliamentary bill received royal assent on 14 July 1864 and became the London and South-western (Kensington and Richmond) Railway Act 1864 (27 & 28 Vict. c. clxvi); the share capital was £330,000; the line would be six miles (9.7 km) long. The authorisation permitted the Kensington and Richmond line to connect into the Hammersmith and City Railway (H&CR) near its Hammersmith terminus. This was granted to allow the trains of the Great Western Railway (GWR) and the Metropolitan Railway, users of the Hammersmith and City line, to run trains on to Richmond. The Hammersmith and City line operated on the broad gauge at the time; the GWR could require mixed gauge track to be installed on the LSWR, in which case it would pay for the work. There would be a short section of the H&CR on which LSWR trains would run, and a joint H&CR/LSWR station was to be built there; the H&CR would have to be converted to dual-gauge at this point. At South Acton, an Acton Junction Line would allow trains to work from the N&SWJR to the Richmond terminus.

South-western, Kensington, and Richmond Railway Act 1865
- Act of Parliament
- Parliament of the United Kingdom
- Long title: An Act for authorizing "The London and South-western Railway Company" to abandon the making of Lines of Railway at Kensington and Hammersmith, and to make other Lines of Railway instead thereof, and to make the "Chiswick Curve;" and for other Purposes.
- Citation: 28 & 29 Vict. c. lxxxix

Dates
- Royal assent: 19 June 1865

Text of statute as originally enacted

The connecting lines and other arrangements were repeatedly revised in the following years, authorised by a series of further acts of Parliament. A second act of Parliament in June 1865, the South-western, Kensington, and Richmond Railway Act 1865 (28 & 29 Vict. c. lxxxix), allowed an extension of time; it also altered the layout at Hammersmith to give a separate through line from Kensington, with connections onto and off from the H&CR, the intention being that some K&R trains would run over the H&CR to call at the joint station whilst others would by-pass it. This act also sanctioned a Chiswick Curve, to allow direct running from Hounslow LSWR onto the Kensington line, just south of the present Gunnersbury station. A Kew Bridge Curve, for direct running between Richmond and Hounslow was authorised by the London and South-western Railway (Additional Powers) Act 1866 (29 & 30 Vict. c. ccxvi), but it was never built.

The Hammersmith connections were altered again in the following year: now there would be a single junction north of the H&CR terminus, allowing trains to run from the H&CR running south from Goldhawk Road towards Richmond, and abandoned the proposed joint interchange station. In its place, the LSWR would build a station at Hammersmith Grove, south of the proposed junction, which GWR and Metropolitan trains would be able to use on payment and which would be connected by 'a convenient passageway', enclosed and covered and at least 10 ft wide, passing over the H&CR into its Hammersmith terminus.

=== Opening of the line ===
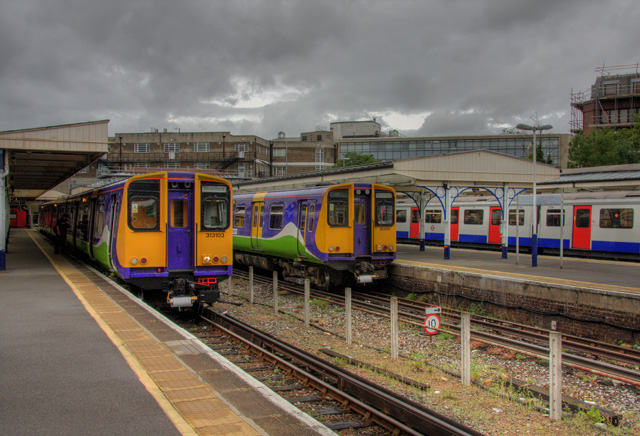
A more modern view of Richmond station; the two trains on the left are for the North London Line, successor to N&SWJR services; on the right is an Underground train, successor to the District Railway trains

The River Thames crossing at Kew had been started in 1865, and this enabled the line to be finally opened on 1 January 1869; the LSWR train service was approximately hourly between Richmond and Waterloo; from Kensington the trains ran south to cross the Thames again, and turn towards Waterloo via Latchmere Junction and West London Junction at Battersea. This access to Latchmere Junction enabled the LSWR to run from there to Ludgate Hill via Factory Junction and Loughborough Junction. There had been a Kensington to Ludgate Hill service since 1 February 1868, so this was simply started back from Richmond via Hammersmith. Richmond to Ludgate Hill took an hour; about ten trains ran each way daily.

The North London Railway (NLR) took advantage of the Richmond end of the new route, running trains from Richmond to Broad Street, via Gunnersbury Junction (then known as Brentford Road Junction) and South Acton Junction (then simply Acton Junction). The Kew east curve of 1862 (South Acton towards Barnes) continued in use, but the Barnes West curve was no longer required, and was removed after authorisation in the South Western Railway (Various Powers) Act 1880 (43 & 44 Vict. c. clxxxiii) of 26 August 1880. The North London Railway Company's trains ran alternately to Broad Street and to Kew Bridge, hourly to each destination forming a 30-minute frequency as far as South Acton. From 1909 the service frequency was doubled.

=== The route of the line ===
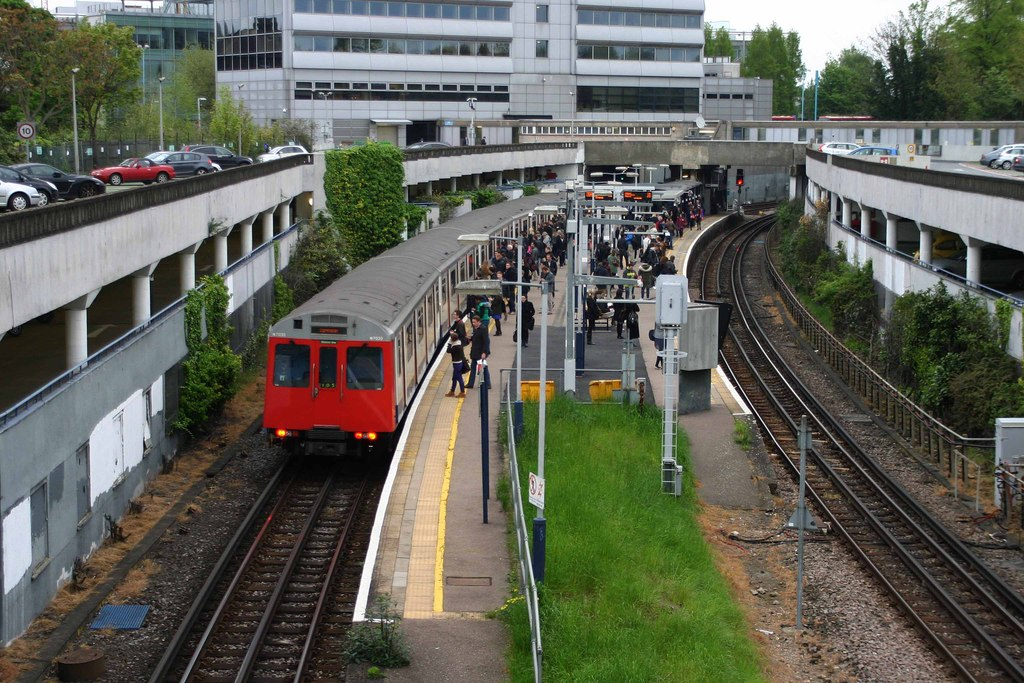
A District Line train at Gunnersbury station in modern times

The new line had a separate terminus station at Richmond, alongside and on the north of the through station. The N&SWJR had its own booking office and clerks there, until 1917. After Kew Gardens station, the line crossed the river Thames on a five-span girder bridge and crossed the LSWR Hounslow line. The Chiswick curve trailed in at the south end of Gunnersbury station. The Chiswick curve enabled goods trains to access the Hounslow line to and from the Hammersmith direction. At the north end of Gunnersbury station, a facing junction led to the Acton Junction line of the LSWR; this joined the original N&SWJR line at South Acton station, and was now the normal route for N&SWJR passenger trains leaving Richmond. Although the area through which the main line ran was still relatively rural, Hammersmith was developing fast as a residential area, and the Midland Railway in particular, as a joint lessee from 1871 of the N&SWJR, was establishing house-coal deliveries to yards in the Hammersmith area.

This formed a triangle; the eastern apex was Acton Lane Junction. As far as this point the trajectory of the line had been north-east, but now it turned east and ran through Turnham Green and (later) Stamford Brook and Ravenscourt Park stations, turning sharply north just before the Hammersmith and City Railway's station at Hammersmith. The LSWR had its own station adjacent, Hammersmith (Grove Road). At this point the line was about half a mile from Kensington station, but the intervening area was already built up. The line ran north alongside and on the west side of the Hammersmith and City line, with a junction into it, enabling GWR trains (as a user of the H&CR) to operate over the LSWR route. This working was done from 1 June 1870, with an hourly Richmond to Paddington service. The LSWR then descended and turned east, passing under the H&CR, with a later station at Shepherds Bush. The line curved round to the south, immediately north of the (later) Bulgrave Road and Minford Gardens, and the LSWR joined the West London Railway at Richmond Junction, 500 yards (460 m) north of Addison Road station. The LSWR was a one-sixth owner of the West London Extension Railway, but it had no rights on the short length of WLR; this remained a sore point with the LNWR, but the point was never pressed to a legal conflict.

South from Addison Road, the West London Extension Railway was already established, with junctions at Latchmere Junction east to Waterloo and separately to Factory Junction on the London Chatham and Dover Railway, and west to Clapham Junction (Windsor Lines station).

The Chiswick curve was opened at the same time as the remainder of the Kensington and Richmond line, but a regular passenger service was not started until 1 June 1870. The LSWR Richmond–Kensington–Waterloo trains were diverted over it, starting from Hounslow instead. The Richmond connection was covered by LSWR Ludgate Hill trains and the GWR Richmond service. This arrangement was short-lived: from 1 November 1870, the GWR trains were withdrawn, the LSWR resuming a Richmond–Kensington–Waterloo working, supplying Hounslow connections by means of a shuttle service to and from Brentford Road (later Gunnersbury). By 1914 there were eleven trains each way between there and the Hounslow line, running to Twickenham or Feltham. This service was discontinued from 22 February 1915, and only special trains and horsebox workings used the spur after that. The Southern Railway closed this spur on 29 May 1930, as that traffic could operate via Old Kew Junction. The track was removed in July 1932 and blocks of fiats were built on the land.

As housing expansion developed at the London end of the line, two more stations were opened: Shaftesbury Road, opened on 1 April 1873, later renamed Ravenscourt Park, and Shepherds Bush station on 1 May 1874.

== Friendly competitors ==
The Kensington and Richmond line attracted several competing companies to use parts of its line.

=== District Railway ===
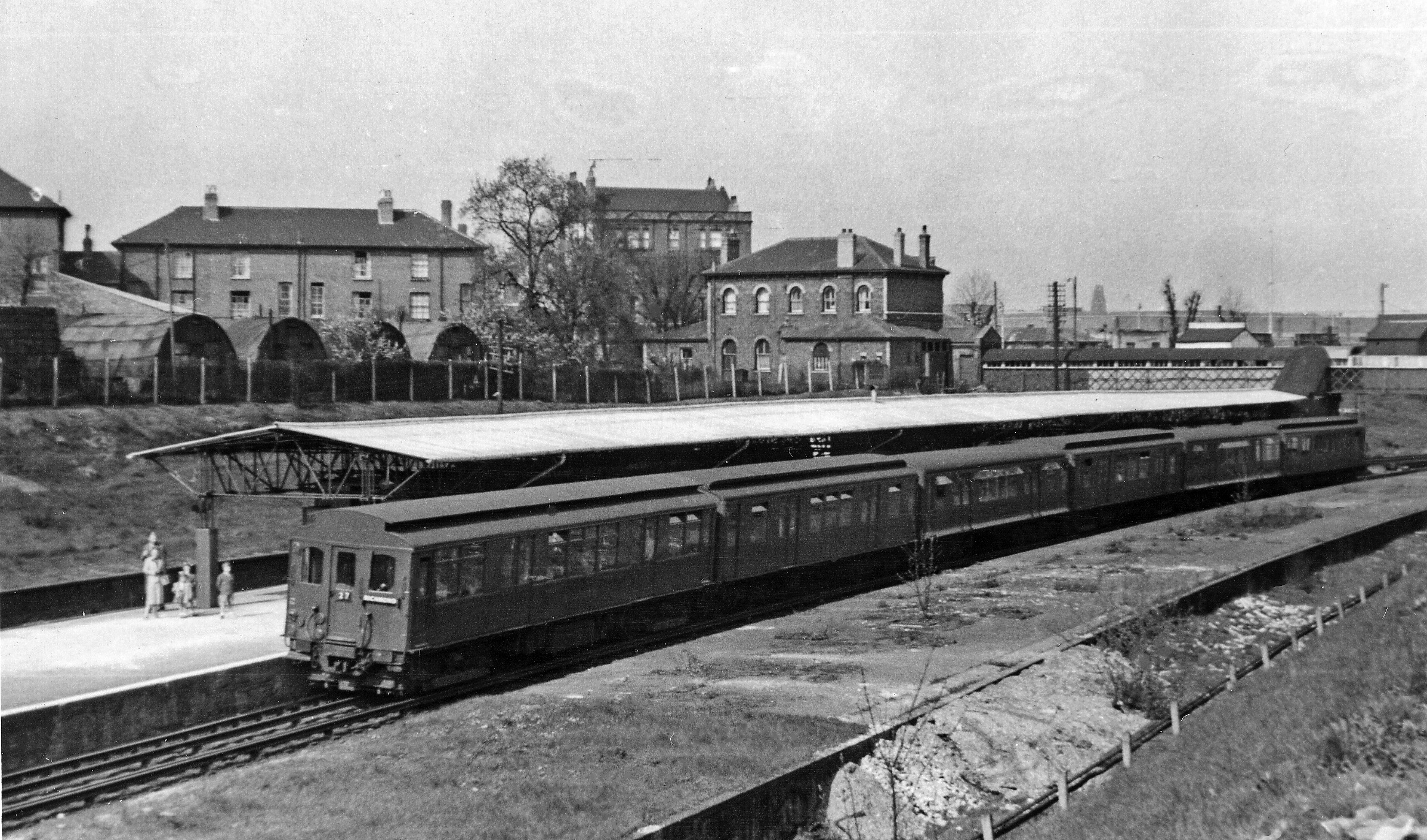
A District line train at Gunnersbury station; the view is to the north

The Metropolitan District Railway (MDR) extended from Earls Court to Hammersmith (Broadway) on 9 September 1874. By the Metropolitan District Railway Act 1875 (38 & 39 Vict. c. ccviii), the District Railway secured running powers over the LSWR line to Richmond New station, in return for giving up other routes that it had been planning. Under the same act the District Railway constructed a half-mile link from its Hammersmith station to the K&R, climbing at 1-in-46 to what was to be known as Studland Road Junction. The engineering, which included the rebuilding of Hammersmith station, was substantial. District Railway trains reached Richmond on 1 June 1877; traffic was good from the start, with 54,000 passengers carried in the first month, but some difficulty and a few unpleasant accidents were caused by the considerable difference between the levels of the District carriage floors and the low LSWR platforms.

The District Railway had further expansion plans, and on 1 July 1879 it opened a new line from Bedford Park Junction, Turnham Green, to Ealing Broadway, and overnight became the dominant user of the Kensington and Richmond line; the running powers for this line and its offshoots were protected in the Metropolitan District Railway Act 1877 (40 & 41 Vict. c. ccxxxiii).

=== Metropolitan Railway ===
The Metropolitan Railway had also been exploring the potential of this part of suburban west London; a horse omnibus operated from Turnham Green to the H&CR Shepherd's Bush station from 5 July 1875; from 12 June 1876 the buses ran to Hammersmith H&CR station. Next the Metropolitan started to run an hourly service between Moorgate Street and Richmond via Hammersmith Grove Road from 1 October 1877. The eastern terminus was altered to Aldgate on 1 January 1894. These trains worked in the path of one of the ten-minute Aldgate–Hammersmith trains, the diversion to Grove Road making little difference to the Hammersmith passengers, who could use the interconnecting footway between the two stations.

=== Midland Railway ===
The Midland Railway connected to the line from Brent over the N&SWJR. Brent was a major goods marshalling complex for the Midland Railway's London goods and mineral traffic, heavily dominated by coal. Mutual running powers were agreed with the LSWR, which acquired the useful ability to run its own goods trains to Brent Sidings.

From 3 August 1875 Midland passenger trains began to work between Moorgate Street and Acton. This circuitous service proved to be unattractive, and it ceased on 1 February 1876, but the Midland made another attempt on 1 May 1878, with an even more roundabout route from St Pancras to Earl's Court via Cricklewood and Acton, using a new "Acton curve", south from the South Acton-Gunnersbury line at Bollo Lane Junction to the K&R at Acton Lane Junction, one-half mile (0.80 km) west of Turnham Green station. This curve was authorised by the South-western Railway General Act 1871 (34 & 35 Vict. c. clxvii) of 24 July 1871; it was chiefly intended to carry domestic coal trains to the Midland's own coal yards at Kensington High Street and West Kensington; they opened in early 1878. These coal trains were the only regular freight traffic ever worked over the K&R line, which had no goods yards along its route.

The Midland's service from St Pancras was known as the "Outermost Circle", but it was unsuccessful and it ran for the last time on the evening of 30 September 1880. The Midland made a further bid for West London traffic on 1 January 1894 when it extended some Cricklewood trains to Gunnersbury; for a time eleven workings ran each way daily. This too failed, and was withdrawn on 1 October 1902. From 1 July 1905 to October 1908 the Midland ran passenger trains from Bradford to Portsmouth via Hendon and Richmond, and in the summer of 1911 there were also LNWR Manchester–Southampton trains running via Gunnersbury.

=== GWR and Metropolitan Railway jointly ===
The Great Western Railway and the Metropolitan Railway worked trains jointly on the Hammersmith and City line, and from 1 January 1894 they started running a joint service between Aldgate and Richmond via Hammersmith, Grove Road. The H&CR became fully electrified on 3 December 1906, and the GWR steam trains, with their small four-wheeled coaches were a considerable inconvenience on the busy underground lines, so from 1 January 1907 they were cut back to run between Notting Hill (now Ladbroke Grove) and Richmond, approximately half-hourly; hourly on Sundays. This operation was unprofitable and was discontinued on 1 January 1911. The connection at Hammersmith from the H&CR line towards the LSWR was removed in November 1914; it had been left in place because the Metropolitan Railway had harboured a plan to run its electric trains to Richmond, but reality struck home and the plan was finally abandoned.

== Loss of LSWR dominance ==
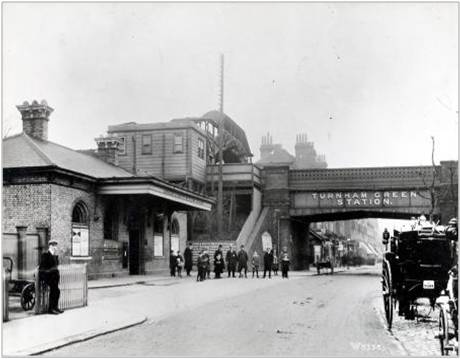
Turnham Green station in 1910

In the face of so many competing companies running trains on the line, the LSWR was passive regarding its own services. By 1900 the LSWR was the minor operator on its own line; it was working about 28 passenger trains each way daily, compared with 61 by the other companies between Richmond and Gunnersbury (25 District, 17 Metropolitan/GWR and 19 NLR). In the busiest 50 minutes of the morning peak at Richmond this combination produced trains of five different companies serving six different destinations (Broad Street, Waterloo, Ludgate Hill, Whitechapel, New Cross, and Aldgate). Gunnersbury was an important junction station for many years. It had five tracks serving two island platforms and an extra face on the west side, all converging to double track at the south side of the bridge under Chiswick High Road. South of the station, two pairs of tracks continued for about 400 yards (370 m) until the westernmost pair swung away to form the Chiswick Curve.

== Quadrupling and electrification ==
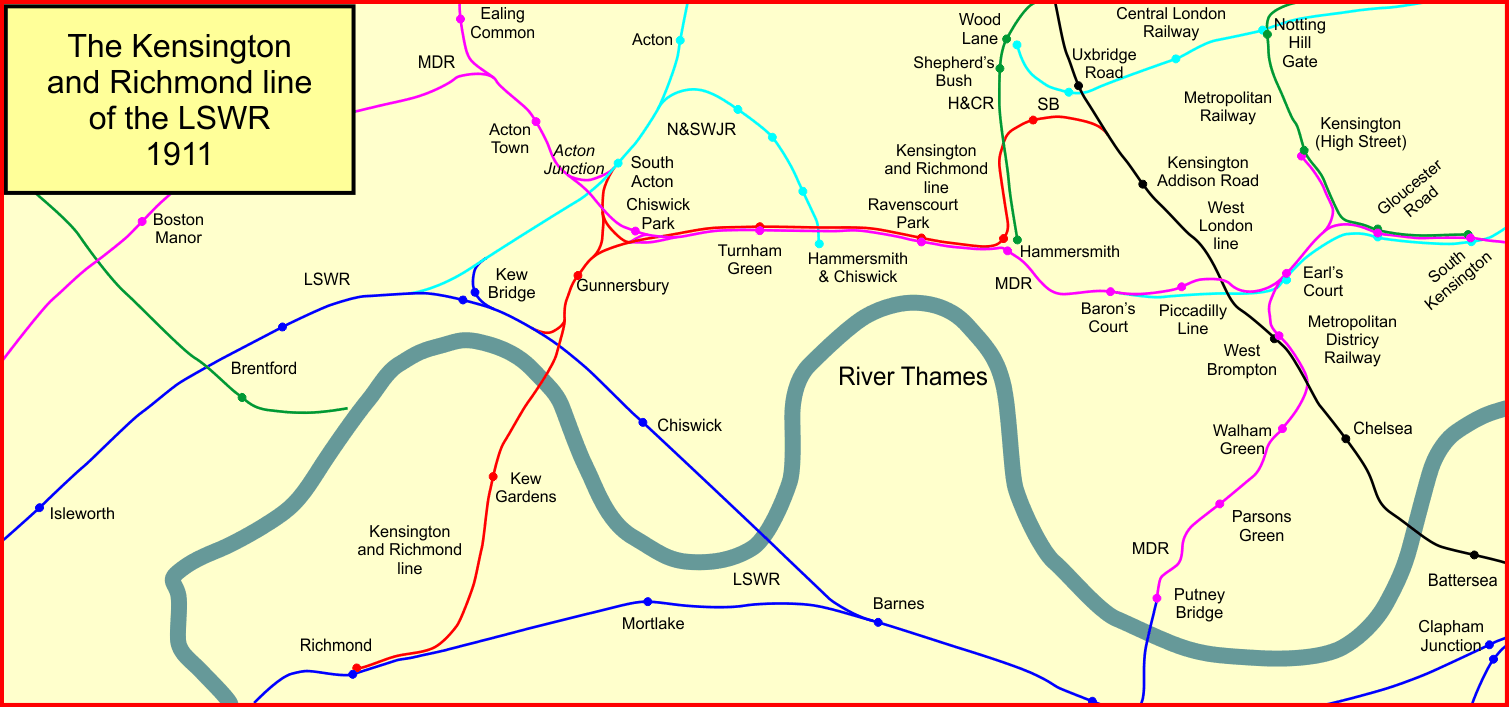
The Kensington and Richmond line in 1911

As the District Railway developed its "western branches" the shared LSWR section nearly a mile (1.6 km) long between Studland Road Junction and Turnham Green became saturated, carrying 148 trains daily. As electrification was going to be implemented sooner or later, the District approached the LSWR in 1900, requesting it to install a third track. This was turned down, and in 1902 the MDR asked to purchase it or lease it; this too was rejected, although the Metropolitan District Railway Act 1902 (2 Edw. 7. c. ccxx) authorised the MDR and LSWR to make agreements regarding electrification. In desperation, and agreement was made on 23 July 1903, by which the MDR could run as many trains as it like so long as they did not interfere with LSWR or Metropolitan and Great Western traffic. Electrification of the Hammersmith–Richmond track by the LSWR, with the MDR paying interest on the capital, was covered by another agreement dated 4 December 1903. Part of the problem was the incompatibility of steam train signalling with a high frequency electric service. The LSWR agreed to provide signalling to enable the closest headways, but still using Sykes Lock and Block manual signalling. The MDR and LSWR reached an arrangement about the working of the MDR "western branches" traffic (routes west of Turnham Green) and the District Railway withdrew the quadrupling proposal.

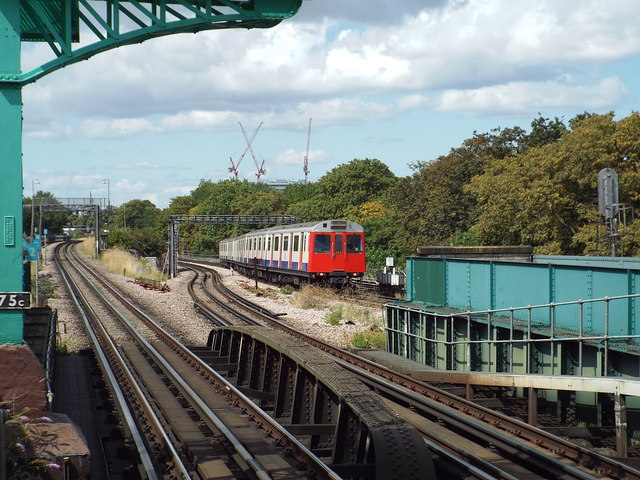
A District line train approaching Turnham Green from the west; the westbound District track is out of shot on the left; the two other tracks visible are the Piccadilly line; the wide interval between them further from the camera is where the LSWR Richmond lines rose, at the time before 1911 when the tracks were paired by user (two LSWR tracks on the north side, two District Railway tracks on the south

The electrification of the District Railway's Ealing, South Harrow and Hounslow services was completed on 1 July 1905, and the MDR Richmond trains ran on the electrical system from 1 August 1905. The section of common user LSWR track was now carrying about 500 steam and electric trains daily; the dependency on the LSWR was extremely frustrating for the MDR, which wished further to develop its western electric services. A new agreement between the LSWR and the MDR was finalised on 11 April 1910 and confirmed by the Metropolitan District Railway Companies Act 1910 (10 Edw. 7 & 1 Geo. 5. c. cix). The LSWR line between Acton Lane (west of Turnham Green) and Studland Road Junction, Hammersmith, would be widened on both sides to accommodate four tracks east of Turnham Green. The two tracks on the south side were to be designated for exclusive MDR and Midland use in perpetuity. The MDR was to have the use and maintenance of the southern platforms at Turnham Green and Ravenscourt Park, and the access to them; the LSWR was to control the booking offices and entrances to these stations, but both the LSWR and the MDR would appoint station staff and ticket collectors for their portions.

The new tracks were all LSWR property apart from two short sections, but signalled throughout by the MDR; they came into use on 3 December 1911. The commissioning of the works had been exceptionally difficult, being done without interruption to the District Railway's electric services. Studland Road ceased to be a physical junction — the northern pair of tracks turned north towards Kensington and the southern pair were simply the continuation of the MDR route from Earls Court. At the Turnham Green a grade-separated junction was installed, carrying the MDR western route over the LSWR.

On 1 February 1912 the District Railway opened a new island platform, called Stamford Brook station, for its own use on the leased tracks between Ravenscourt Park and Turnham Green. This station, to be maintained and staffed by the MDR, had been included in the Metropolitan District Railway Act 1910. The infrastructure enhancements enabled the MDR to bring in a considerably improved train service, which it did in December 1911 and January 1912. There were 198 trains daily to Ealing instead of 119, 144 to Hounslow instead of 121, and 96 to South Harrow instead of 68. The cost of the infrastructure works had been £187,000

=== LSWR passenger service decline ===
The slow and infrequent steam trains of the LSWR compared unfavourably with the new frequent and clean electric trains of the MDR (and other similar London lines), and the contrast was not lost on the public, or the local government organisations. While the MDR was gaining business, the LSWR faced ever increasing competition from alternative electric railway services, electric tramcars and motor buses, and it began to reduce its steam services over the K&R; by 1910 the weekday Waterloo service was down to 13 each way (10 on Sundays) and Ludgate Hill to 10. In 1912 the service to and from Richmond via the K&R ran to Clapham Junction instead of Waterloo; by July 1914 there were only two trains each way between Ludgate Hill and Richmond, and a year later only one. In 1915 the Richmond–Kensington–Clapham Junction service was severely slashed and converted to push-pull operation: two-coach bogie sets, first- and third-class only. On Saturday evening 3 June 1916 all LSWR service over the K&R ceased, and Shepherds Bush, Hammersmith Grove Road and the northern platforms at Turnham Green and Ravenscourt Park were all closed.

=== North London trains electrified ===
From 1 October 1916 the North London Railway started operation of its electric service between Broad Street and Richmond or Kew Bridge; it used the same four-rail system as the MDR. From 1920 the NLR electric trains gave summer Sunday travellers a fifteen-minute service, and this frequency was adopted on weekdays in 1922.

=== Removal of LSWR infrastructure ===
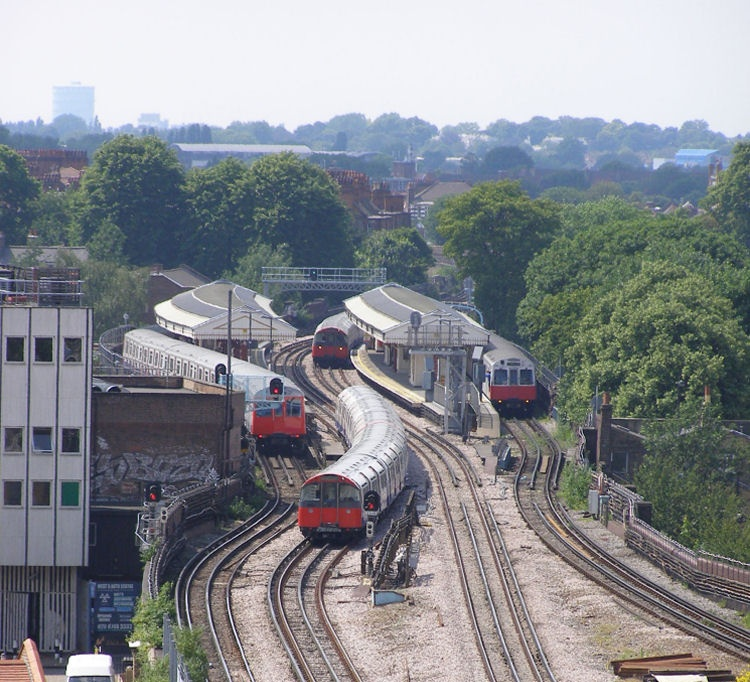
Ravenscourt Park tube station looking west

From 1916 the Kensington and Richmond tracks between Kensington and Turnham Green had been disused, and in 1926, the Southern Railway removed the track and signalling equipment, and told the West London Railway that the junction connections at Richmond Junction, north of Kensington, were no longer required. The land occupied by the disused line north and east of the H&CR Hammersmith car shed, seven acres in all, was offered on a 98-year lease in an advertisement in The Times newspaper of 13 December 1929.

The Underground (the trading name of the Underground Electric Railways Company, successor to the District Railway), was now the only user of the former LSWR route between Studland Road Junction and Turnham Green, apart from the two or three coal trains each day. In 1925 pre-war proposals for the extension of the Piccadilly line were revived, extending the routes to South Harrow and Hounslow. The route between Hammersmith and Turnham Green would operate as a quadruple track section of the Underground as far as a point beyond Acton Town. A new agreement between the MDR, the Southern Railway and the London Electric Railway was ratified by the London Electric and Metropolitan District Railways Act 1926 (16 & 17 Geo. 5. c. lxxxix). The Southern Railway reserved the right to run occasional and special passenger and goods trains, although there was no practical through way for them. The Underground were authorised to run over the Acton Lane-Richmond line, thus opening the way for Piccadilly line services. The SR was to continue to maintain and operate Acton Lane Junction signal box, as well as the earthworks and bridges on the Hammersmith-Turnham Green line.

On the four track section, the Underground made the centre pair of tracks fast for Piccadilly line trains, which ran non-stop between Hammersmith and Acton Town, with the outer pair used by the District trains, calling at all stations. The junction west of Turnham Green was altered accordingly; the new arrangements came into operation on 4 July 1932.

== Rationalisation ==
Gunnersbury station was reduced from five to two tracks in July 1932. With these alterations came the closure of the Chiswick Curve and a consequential reduction to double track south of the station. It took from 1932 until 23 January 1950 for the British Transport Commission to transfer the Turnham Green to Hammersmith section to London transport. British Railways finalised the change by removing the connections at Richmond between the former Kensington line and the Windsor line.

== The present day ==
The section of the former Kensington and Richmond line between Studland Road Junction and Turnham Green continues in use by the District Line and the Piccadilly Line of Transport for London. The section from Turnham Green to Richmond is used by the District line, and south-west from Gunnersbury also by London Overground trains. The section from Studland Road Junction to Richmond Junction, near Kensington (Olympia, formerly Addison Road) has no railway use.

== Locations ==
=== Main line ===
Details given for locations at least partly operational during the period of LSWR activity, until 1916.

- Richmond; new station opened for Windsor, Staines and South Western Railway opened 22 August 1848; still open;
- Kew Gardens; opened 1 January 1869; still open;
- Gunnersbury West Junction; convergence of Chiswick Curve;
- Brentford Road; opened 1 January 1869; renamed Gunnersbury 1 November 1871; still open;
- Gunnersbury East Junction; divergence of Acton Junction line to South Acton, N&SWJR;
- Acton Lane Junction; convergence of Acton Curve (north to east) from Bollo Lane Junction;
- Turnham Green; opened 1 January 1869; still open;
- Stamford Brook; opened 1 February 1912; still open;
- Shaftesbury Road; opened 1 April 1873; renamed Ravenscourt Park 1 March 1888; still open;
- Studland Road Junction; divergence of District Railway towards Earls Court;
- Hammersmith (Grove Road); opened 1 January 1869; closed 5 June 1916;
- Grove Junction; divergence to Hammersmith and City line towards Paddington;
- Shepherds Bush; opened 1 May 1874; closed 5 June 1916;
- Richmond Junction; convergence with West London Railway north of Kensington Addison Road.
