= Windsor lines of the London and South Western Railway =

Railways in south-west London, England

The Windsor lines of the London and South Western Railway ran from Waterloo to Windsor via Richmond, with a loop via Hounslow. They started as the Richmond Railway, a simple independent branch line, but they developed a distinct identity and had their own approach to Waterloo alongside the Main Lines, and a distinct section of Waterloo station. The Richmond Railway was extended to Windsor by the Windsor, Staines, and South Western Railway and the company also built a loop line via Hounslow. Both independent companies were absorbed into the LSWR.

They formed the basis for branch lines and extensions in west London and beyond. They were on the northern boundary of the established area of LSWR territory, and they were subject to incursions by competing companies' lines and trains, seeking access to Richmond and forming north-south links for goods traffic, leading to the construction of Feltham goods yard for marshalling, opened in 1917.

The original routes are identifiable today, although the Eurostar terminal occupied the site of the Windsor Lines station at Waterloo from 1993.

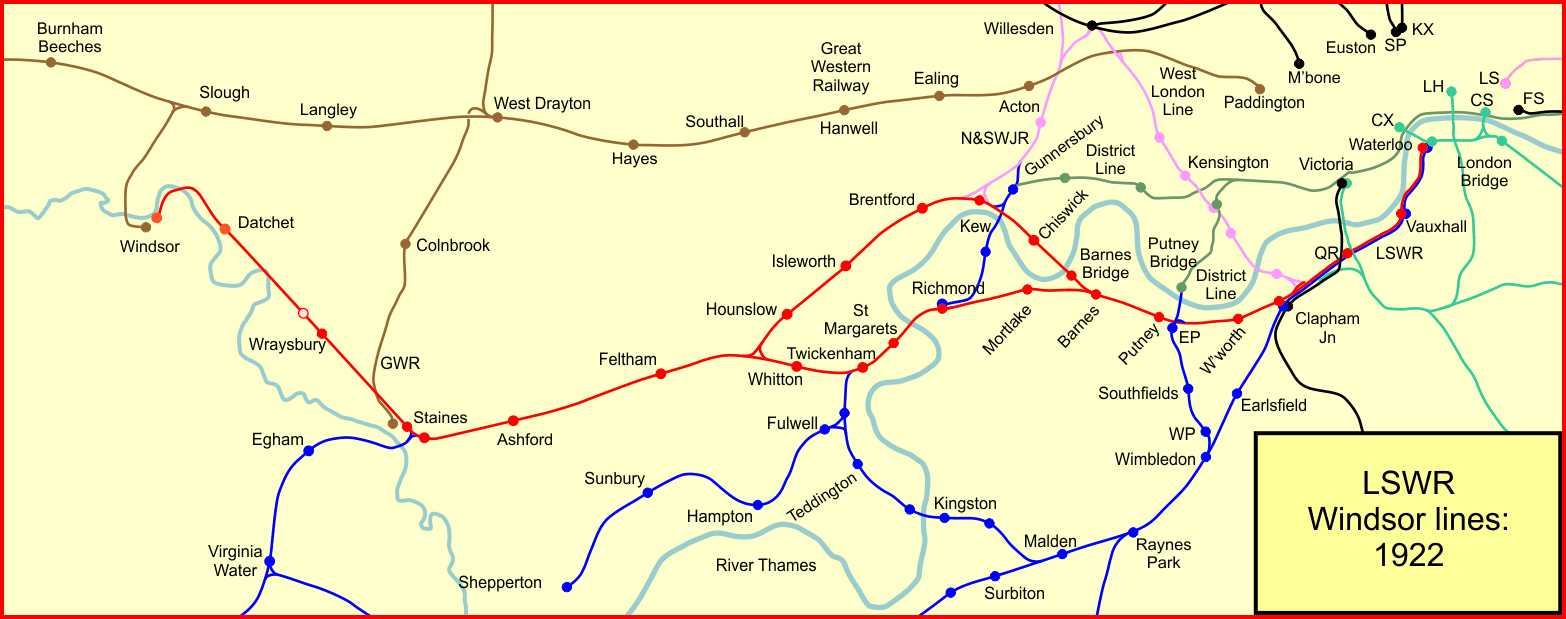
The Windsor lines of the LSWR in 1922

== First railways ==
=== London and Southampton Railway ===
The London and Southampton Railway was opened in stages from 21 May 1838. It was a great success. At first its London terminal was at Nine Elms, and this was not convenient for passengers travelling to and from London.

Gillham observes that;

Passenger steamboats left from Old Swan Pier, Upper Thames Street, not all that close to the City centre but the best that could be managed, one hour before the departure of each train from Nine Elms, and called at several intermediate piers on the way. To take one hour and only get as far as the starting point of the train was clearly not good enough, not even 150 years ago.

=== London and South Western Railway main line ===
The London and Southampton Railway changed its name to the London and South Western Railway by the London and South Western Railway (Portsmouth Branch Railway) Act 1839 (2 & 3 Vict. c. xxviii) of 4 June 1839. The company saw the strategic advantage of securing territory under its control, and took steps to build lines to the west.

== Richmond Railway ==
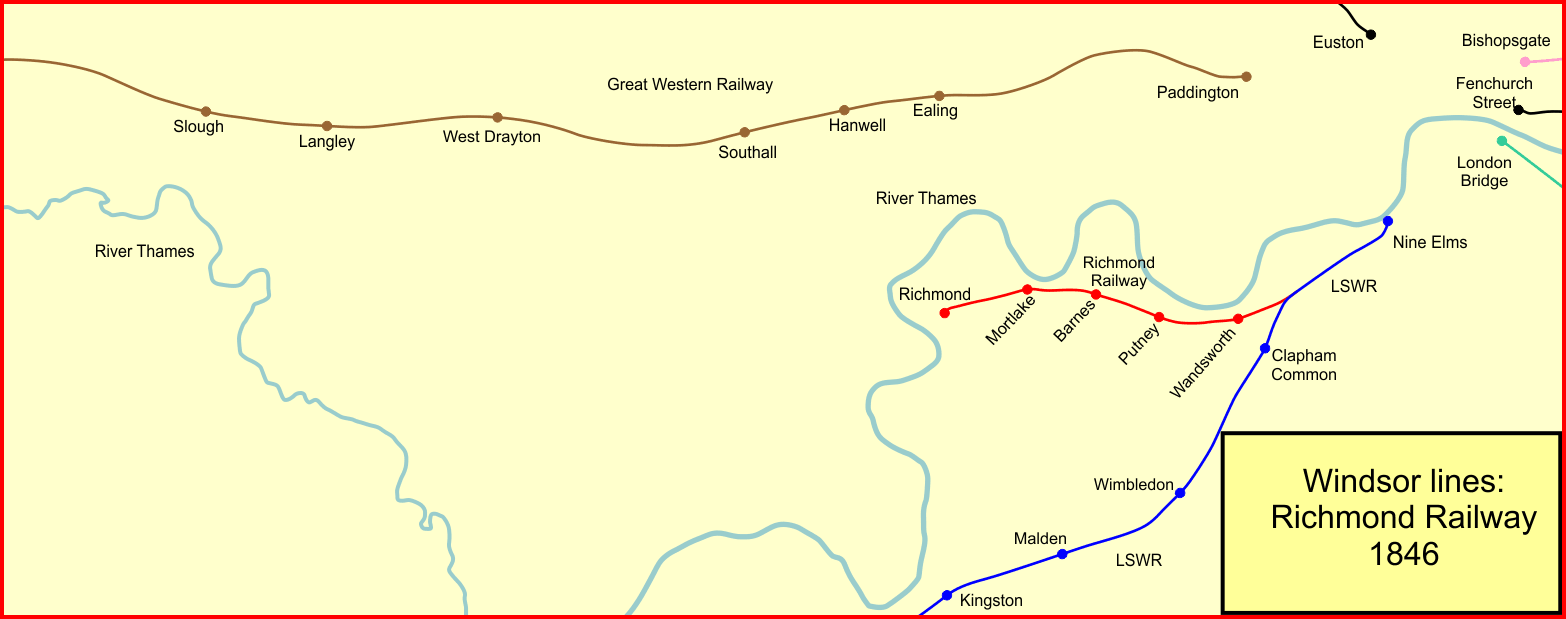
The Richmond Railway in 1846

An independent company, friendly to the LSWR, proposed building a line from Richmond to form a junction with the LSWR at Falcon Bridge. Falcon Road is crossed by the railway at the London end of today's Clapham Junction. The company was authorised as the Richmond Railway by the Richmond (Surrey) Railway Act 1845 (8 & 9 Vict. c. cxxi) of 21 July 1845; share capital was to be £260,000. The route from Richmond lay through Mortlake, Barnes, Putney, and Wandsworth. The line would need a viaduct over the River Wandle and the Surrey Iron Railway, 1,000 feet (300 m) long with twenty-three arches.

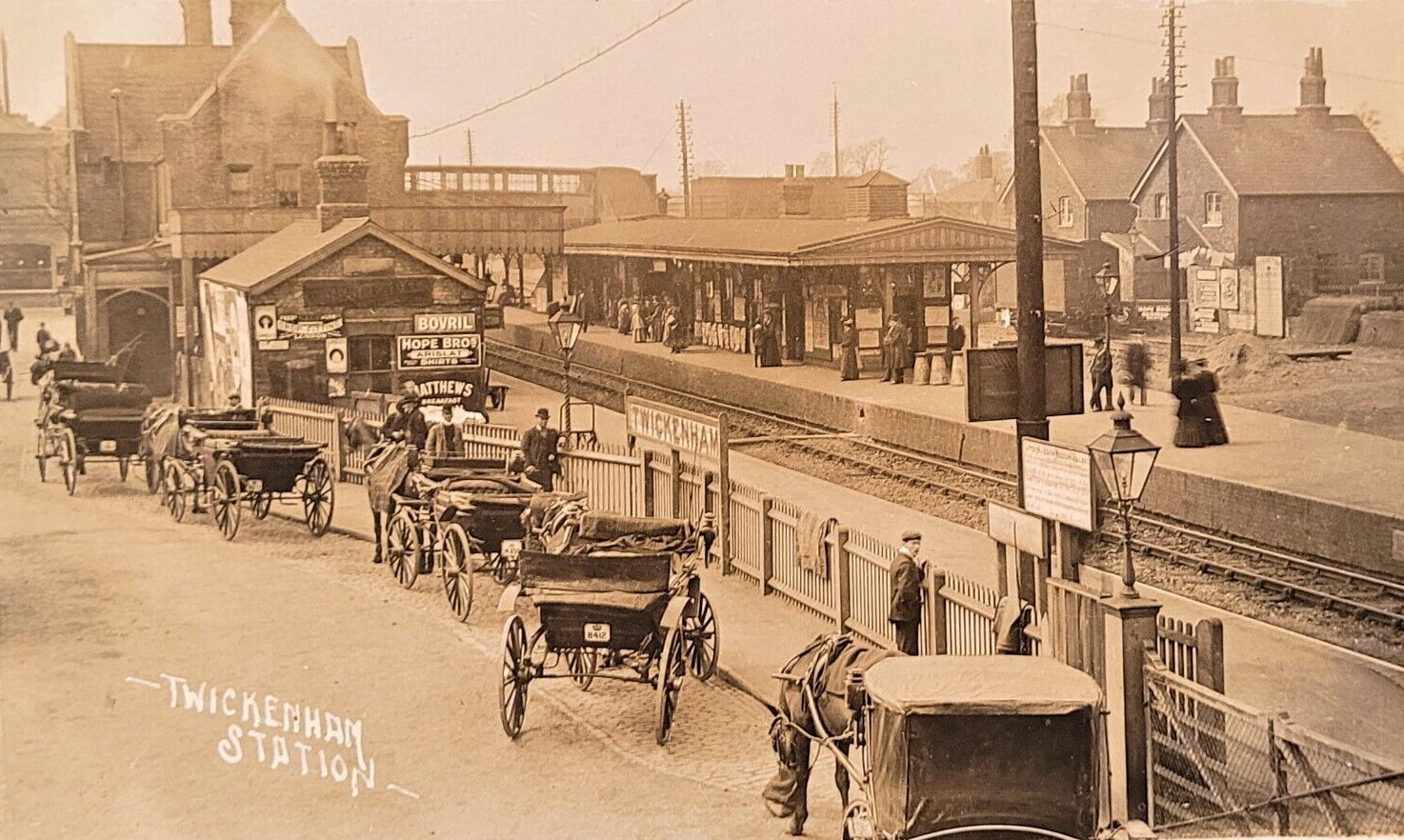
Twickenham railway station in Edwardian times

The promoters of the Richmond Railway appreciated that the Nine Elms terminus was a significant disadvantage to their business in view of the shorter journeys on their line. The original idea of extending to Waterloo came from the Richmond promoters; although Nine Elms was easily reached by steamers, its location was much too remote to be practical for short-distance travellers.

They had originally planned to build their line alongside the LSWR as far as Nine Elms and extend from there to a terminus near Waterloo Bridge, but the LSWR persuaded them to allow the LSWR itself to make that part of the scheme. The LSWR obtained the necessary act of Parliament giving powers to extend to Waterloo Bridge, the London and South-western Railway Metropolitan Extensions Act 1845 (8 & 9 Vict. c. clxv); we know the station today as Waterloo. The extension and the new station were opened on 11 July 1848. From Nine Elms to Waterloo it was constructed with four tracks, two for the Southampton line and two for the Richmond line. As soon as the Richmond line was extended to Windsor on 1 December 1849. "These tracks have always been known as the Windsor Lines right up to the present day."

While the LSWR was building the Waterloo extension, the Richmond Railway opened its own line on 27 July 1846. There had been a directors' special run on 22 July 1846. The Richmond trains were worked by the LSWR but terminated for the time being at Nine Elms; there were seventeen trains each way daily. The business was brisk, over 50,000 passengers being carried each way in June and July 1847.

As the day of opening approached the Richmond Railway negotiated to sell their concern to the LSWR; the transfer was agreed, and was authorised by the London and South Western Railway Amendment Act 1846 (9 & 10 Vict. c. cxxxi) of 3 July 1846, taking effect on the first day of 1847.

== Widening Waterloo to Barnes ==
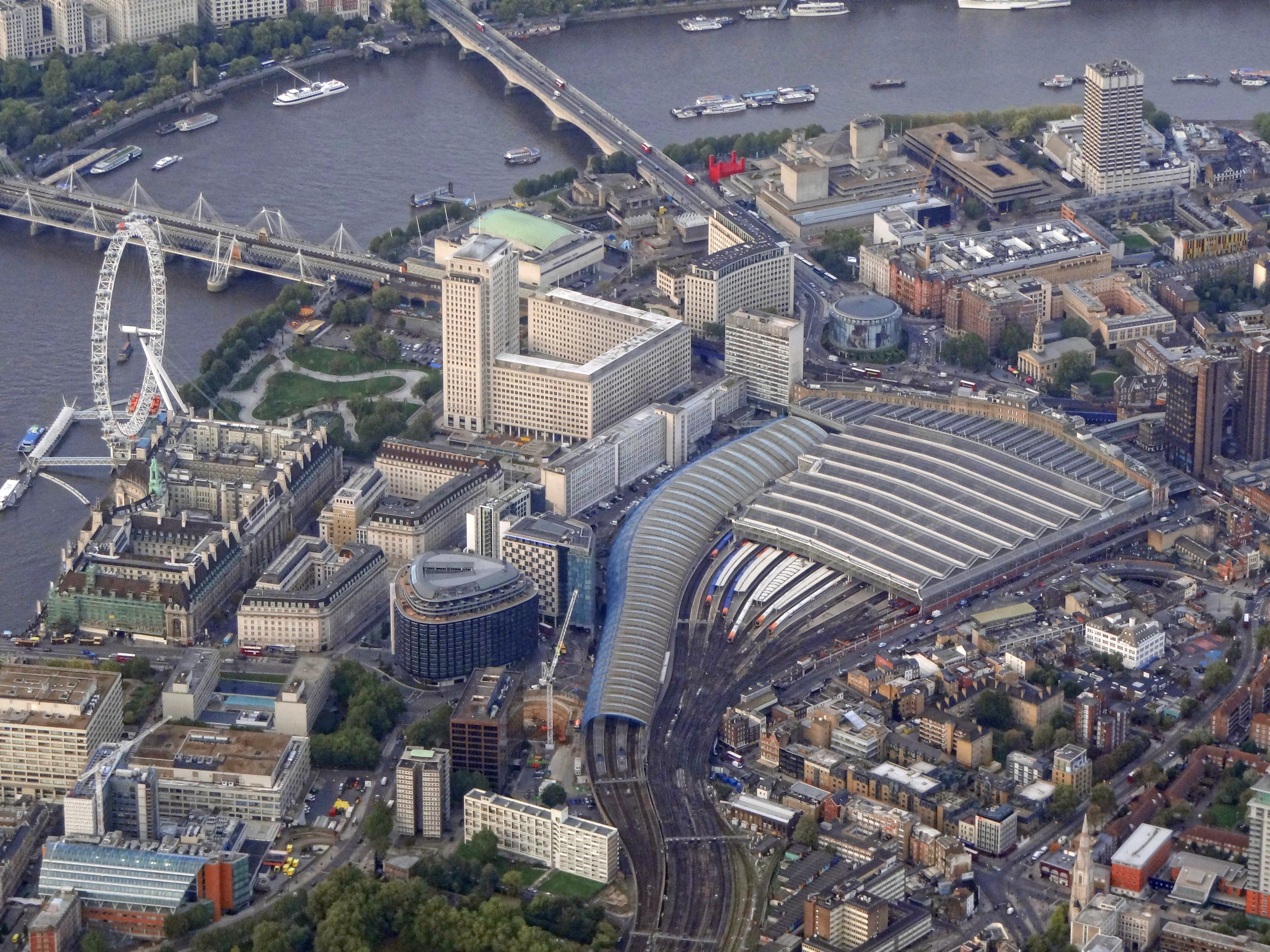
Waterloo Station in 2013

The line approaching Nine Elms from the west was double track at first, for main line and Richmond line trains. The Richmond Railway had proposed laying a separate double track for its line, but the LSWR preferred to arrange this work itself. A third track, in the Up direction, was laid from Falcon Bridge as far as Vauxhall in 1848. A layout with three tracks approaching a major terminal was favoured at the time, enabling empty stock trains and light engines to wait for a platform and not obstruct approaching main line trains. In 1860, four additional platforms were opened at Waterloo for the Windsor traffic, and a fourth, down, track was opened from Vauxhall to Falcon Bridge at the same time, and most train movements were segregated: the Richmond and Windsor services used the northern pair of tracks, and they became known as "the Windsor lines". The part of Waterloo station that they used was known as the "Windsor (line) station".

The previous four tracks into Waterloo were increased to six in 1891, by the addition of an up main line and a down Windsor line. This widening was soon inadequate, and on 20 January 1898, the LSWR board agreed on the desirability of widening the Waterloo–Clapham Junction section to eight tracks as soon as possible. The first steps towards that were taken in 1902, but the process was slow due to the necessity of taking over large numbers of slum dwellings and relocating the occupants. The widening was not carried out continuously from Waterloo to Clapham Junction, but in sections, partly due to the existence of the approach tracks to the Necropolis station, and to Nine Elms goods yard. This first stage was completed in 1907, and at Vauxhall there were two up Windsor lines, but from there to Waterloo there was only one, and a new Up Main Relief Line occupied the fifth space (between the Up Main Line and the Down Windsor Local Line).

Vauxhall station was a centre for London's milk supply. In 1913 it handled 1,500 churns daily. Arriving milk trains berthed in the Up Windsor Local Line platform at Vauxhall to unload, the entire ordinary Windsor line traffic being carried over the Up Windsor Through Line. Trains arriving at Waterloo stopped at Vauxhall for ticket collection; this was discontinued for Windsor line trains in October 1912.

From Falcon Junction (at the later Clapham Junction) to Nine Elms a third, Up track was installed.

When electrification of the suburban network was authorised in 1912, the quadrupling of the Windsor lines in the Nine Elms area was also approved. The work was ready in January 1916. The section from west of Nine Elms Junction towards Clapham Junction had four Windsor Line tracks from 1897 when goods lines were converted to passenger use, at first up-down-up-down, but changed in 1907 to up-up-down-down.

Clapham Junction station continued to be a bottleneck with only two Windsor Line tracks through the station. In 1906 a new platform on the north side of the station was brought into use for the Kensington services, releasing a platform for widening the Windsor lines; quadrupling through the station was completed on 13 October 1907.

The volume of traffic between Clapham Junction and Barnes became intolerable, and quadrupling of that section was authorised by the South-western Railway Act 1882 (45 & 46 Vict. c. ccxi) on 10 August 1882. The second up line between Barnes and Putney opened on 15 June 1885, and four-line working throughout between Barnes and Clapham Junction started on 1 June 1887. The Barnes, Putney and Wandsworth stations were enlarged accordingly.

To link the Richmond line at Point Pleasant Junction with the Wimbledon to Fulham line at East Putney Junction, the Putney Junction lines opened on 1 July 1889. As authorised on 10 August 1882, both up and down lines were to have passed high over the double-tracked Richmond line before descending to join it on the north side. The quadrupling the Richmond line, however, made need for the Putney Junction down line to leave it from the south side and reach East Putney Junction by a separate brick viaduct to prevent down trains causing delay by crossing four tracks on the level.

=== Windsor, Staines and South Western Railway ===
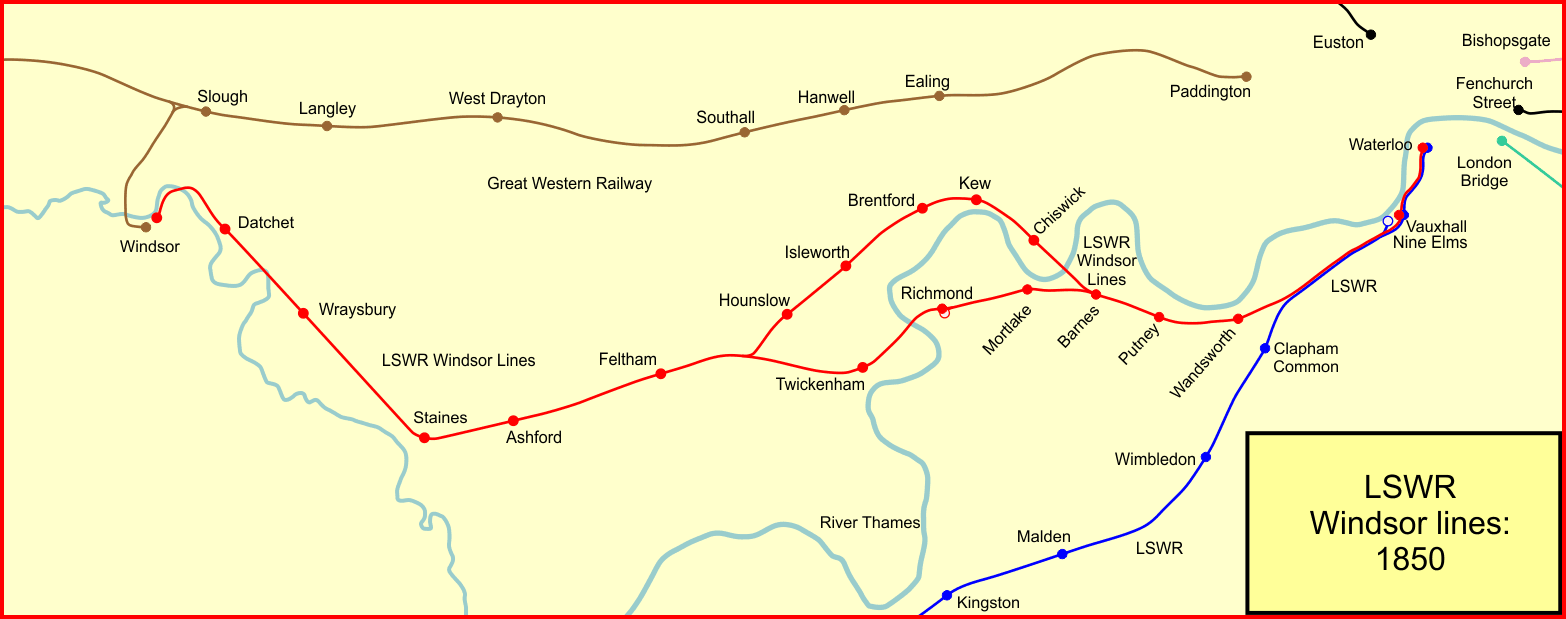
The Windsor lines of the LSWR in 1850

Hounslow, Brentford and Staines, and above all Windsor, were attractive places to live in, and was attractive to the promoters of new railways; in 1845 a number of schemes were put forward. In the 1846 session of Parliament, the Windsor, Slough and Staines Atmospheric Railway was put forward. It would have been a broad gauge system worked on the atmospheric principle, and allied to the Great Western Railway (GWR). It was rejected in Parliament, and its promoters sought a sponsor to help them in a further attempt to get authorisation. The Richmond Railway had an affiliated company, the Staines and Richmond Junction Railway, which had also been turned down in Parliament. The two unsuccessful projects were combined under the sponsorship of the Richmond Railway, and the provisional Windsor, Staines and South Western Railway (WS&SWR) came to be formed in the latter half of 1846. The Slough connection was removed from the scheme, as was the atmospheric traction idea.

Windsor, Staines, and South-western Railway Act (No. 1) 1847
- Act of Parliament
- Parliament of the United Kingdom
- Long title: An Act for making a Railway from Richmond to Windsor, with a Loop Line through Brentford and Hounslow.
- Citation: 10 & 11 Vict. c. lviii

Dates
- Royal assent: 25 June 1847

Text of statute as originally enacted

Windsor, Staines, and South-western Railway Act (No. 2) 1847
- Act of Parliament
- Parliament of the United Kingdom
- Long title: An Act for making a Railway from Staines to join the London and South-western Railway, near Farnborough, with a Branch to Chertsey.
- Citation: 10 & 11 Vict. c. lvii

Dates
- Royal assent: 25 June 1847

Text of statute as originally enacted

It was authorised as such in two acts of Parliament of 25 June 1847. The authorisation was in two parts: the Windsor, Staines, and South-western Railway Act (No. 1) 1847 (10 & 11 Vict. c. lviii) for a line from Richmond to Datchet, approaching Windsor, by way of Twickenham and Staines. The other authorisation was in the Windsor, Staines, and South-western Railway Act (No. 2) 1847 (10 & 11 Vict. c. lvii). A loop line would be created by building from a junction at Barnes through Brentford and Hounslow, rejoining the main line at Whitton. The reason for terminating at Datchet was that negotiations over access through the Royal Park at Windsor had not been concluded. Indeed at this stage it was planned to make a joint Windsor station with the Great Western Railway, which intended to make a line from Slough to Windsor. The line was opened from Richmond to Datchet on 22 August 1848, following an inspection run by the directors on 19 August. Fifteen up and twelve down trains ran over the line every weekday. The Richmond terminus of the Richmond Railway was unsuitable as a through station, and a new station a short distance to the north was built.

South-western Windsor Extension Act 1849
- Act of Parliament
- Parliament of the United Kingdom
- Long title: An Act for enabling the Windsor, Staines, and South-western (Richmond to Windsor) Railway Company to make an Extension of their Railway to the Town of New Windsor; and for other Purposes.
- Citation: 12 & 13 Vict. c. xxxiv

Dates
- Royal assent: 26 June 1849

Text of statute as originally enacted

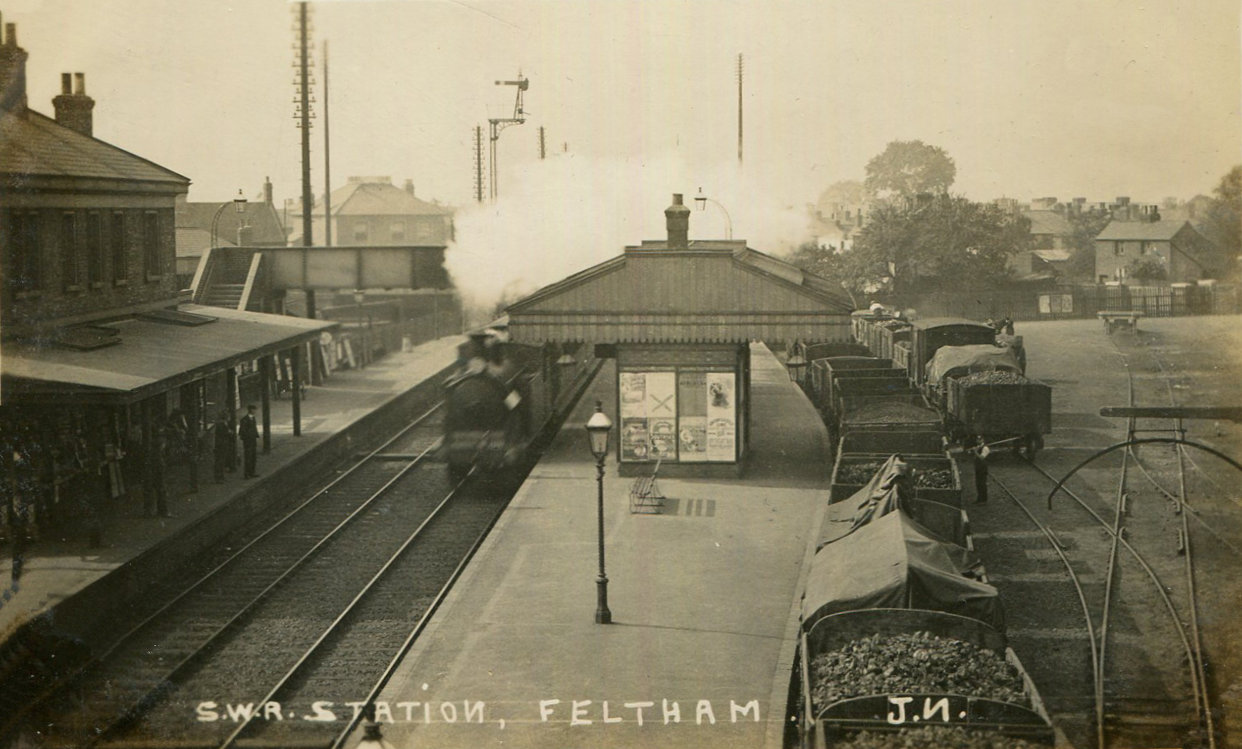
Feltham railway station

After some dubious dealing by the Commissioners of Woods, Forests, Land Revenues, Works and Buildings, acting for the Windsor estate, a further act of Parliament, the South-western Windsor Extension Act 1849 (12 & 13 Vict. c. xxxiv), was passed on 26 June 1849 to authorise crossing the River Thames and reaching Windsor. The line was built hastily, and on 9 August 1849 two piers of the Thames river bridge at a location known as Black Potts settled, making the line unusable. Shortly afterwards the bridge over the Grand Union Canal suffered similarly when the centres were struck. Rectification measures were put in hand, and the line opened to a temporary station at Windsor on 1 December 1849. There was something of a race against the GWR, building its branch from Slough, and the bridge failures allowed the GWR to open its Windsor station first, on 8 October 1849.

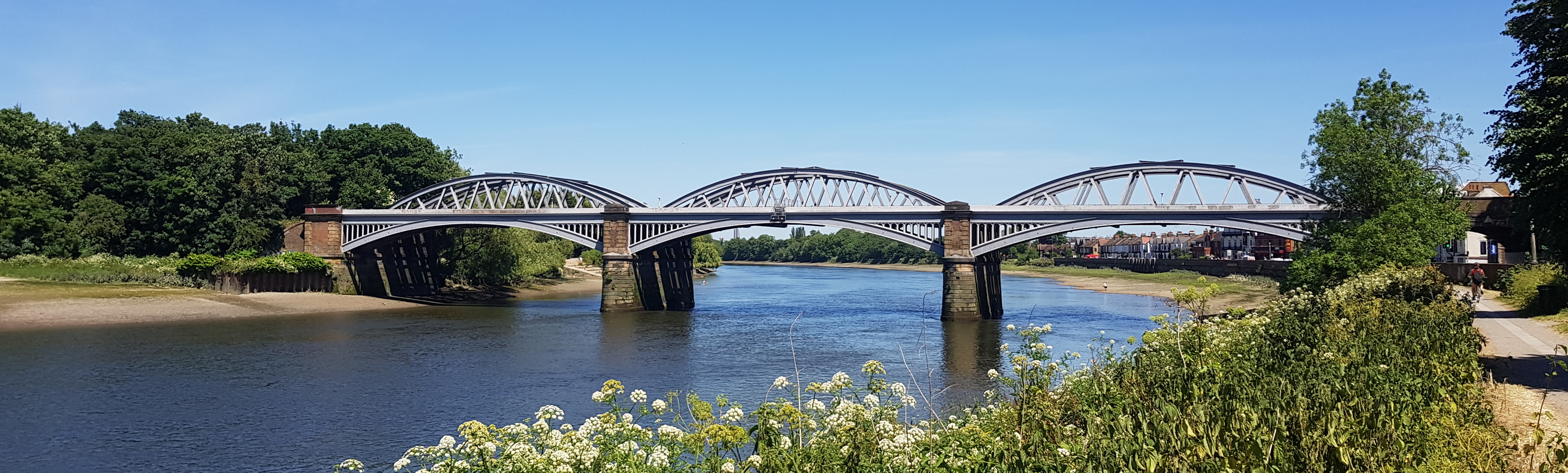
Barnes railway bridge

The company opened part of its Hounslow loop line, from Barnes to a temporary station at Smallberry Green (on the approach to Isleworth) on 22 August 1849. The line was extended to Whitton on 1 February 1850, and Smallberry Green ceased to be a station.

The temporary station at Windsor was widely held to be inadequate and inappropriate at the royal town, and a fine permanent station opened on 1 May 1851. Certain lavish decorations were brought from Farnborough, which had hitherto been used as the royal station closest to Windsor. The LSWR negotiated terms for leasing the WS&SWR but in fact most shareholders took up an alternative offer of £16 for each WS&SWR £16 share with £12 paid up, that the company was merged with the LSWR from 30 June 1850.

== Connecting lines ==
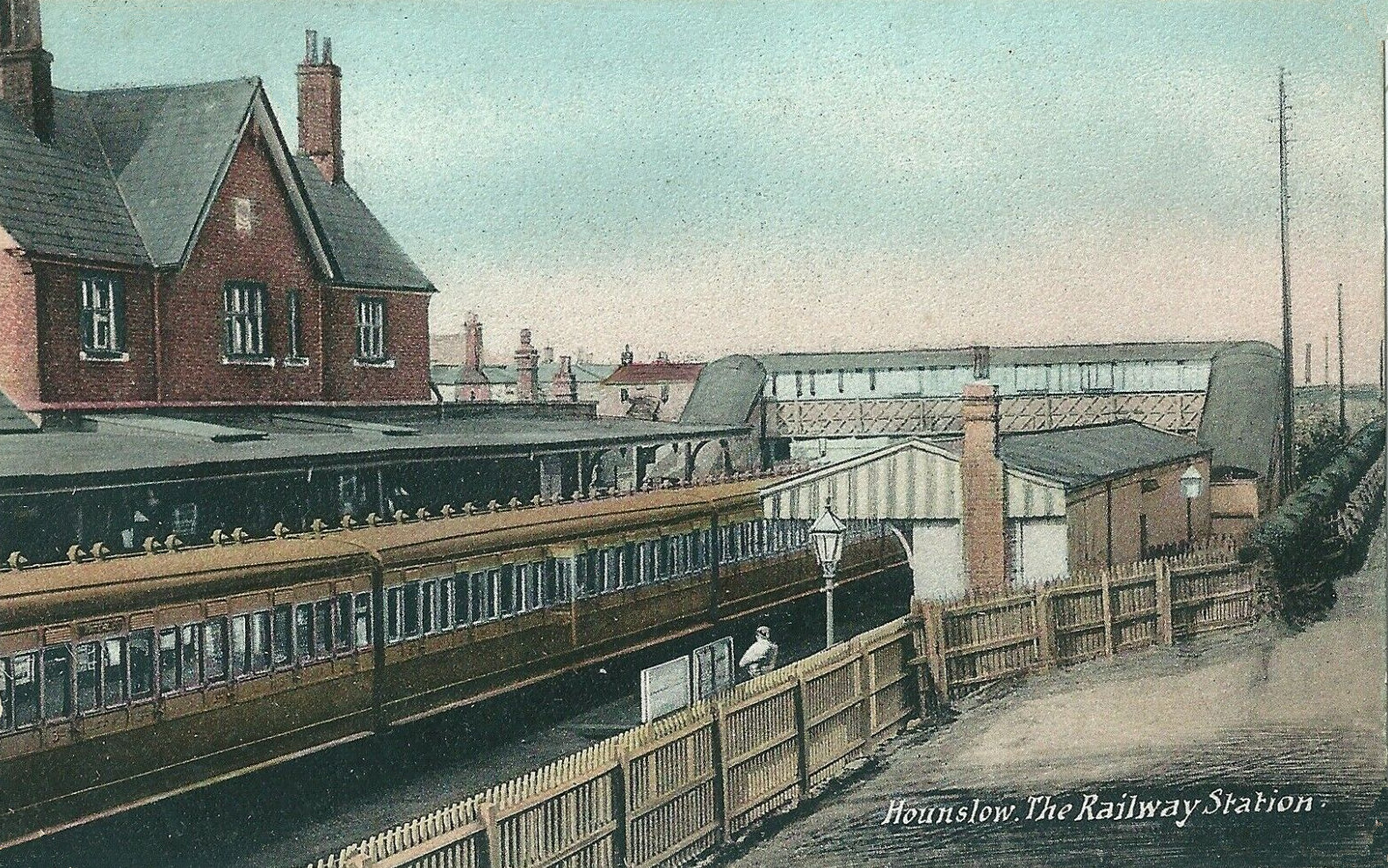
A steam train at Hounslow station

The line from Waterloo to Windsor, with the Hounslow loop line, was limited in extent, but formed an important backbone for the development of a considerable network of inner- and outer-suburban routes, collectively known as "the Windsor lines". The subsequent development added new territory to the area controlled by the LSWR, but also introduced new competition. The disadvantage of the Waterloo terminus, located rather remotely from the City of London, continued to be significant and several schemes addressed the problem of access.

=== North and South Western Junction Railway ===
Since 1846 promoters had shown an interest in a railway that would connect the London and North Western Railway and the LSWR. Goods transfer would be hugely simplified by such a line. Proposals were repeatedly rebuffed until on 24 July 1851 the North and South Western Junction Railway (N&SWJR) was authorised, connecting Willesden (LNWR) and Brentford. It appeared at first to be supported both by the LNWR and the LSWR. Those railways had second thoughts during the construction period and made serious difficulties about actually operating it as they had promised. Eventually it opened for goods traffic on 15 February 1853, and passenger services began on 1 August 1853. There were four North London Railway trains daily from Hampstead Road station to a temporary platform at Kew, until a N&SWJR station was built there soon after.

The trains made connections for Fenchurch Street, in the City of London. The North London Railway arranged the necessary onward journey. The N&SWJR wanted to get access to Windsor, and the LSWR reluctantly arranged some through trains from 1 June 1854. Access to the City was the LSWR's weakness, but the roundabout journey was impractical for residential travel, and the service was cut back to Kew once again from November 1854, after six months only.

In 1857 and 1858, the N&SWJR attempted to get a railway direct to Richmond authorised, and the Great Western Railway tried for a line from its Brentford branch. Both of these were unsuccessful, but the LSWR could see that sooner or later Parliament would grant such a line, and they decided to facilitate an N&SWJR service to Richmond by reversing at Kew and running to Barnes, and again reversing there and running to Richmond. This started on 20 May 1858, and the LSWR got the facility of running the same service as far as Hampstead Road. Some LSWR through coaches ran to Fenchurch Street. Nine passenger trains ran on the N&SWJR on weekdays. Nevertheless it was goods traffic that was the NS&WJR's success story, as the volume of exchange traffic from the LNWR was considerable.

=== Staines, Wokingham and Woking Railway ===
Staines, Wokingham, and Woking Railway Act 1853
- Act of Parliament
- Parliament of the United Kingdom
- Long title: An Act for making a Railway from Staines to Wokingham and Woking.
- Citation: 16 & 17 Vict. c. lxxxv

Dates
- Royal assent: 8 July 1853

Text of statute as originally enacted

Staines, Wokingham and Woking Railway Amendment Act 1855
- Act of Parliament
- Parliament of the United Kingdom
- Long title: An Act to vary the Mode of carrying the Staines, Wokingham, and Woking Railway across certain Roads, and for other Purposes.
- Citation: 18 & 19 Vict. c. cxxxix

Dates
- Royal assent: 16 July 1855

Text of statute as originally enacted

Reading Railways Junction Act 1857
- Act of Parliament
- Parliament of the United Kingdom
- Long title: An Act to empower the Staines, Wokingham, and Woking Railway Company to make a Railway to connect the Reading, Guildford, and Reigate Railway with the Great Western Railway; and for other Purposes.
- Citation: 20 & 21 Vict. c. xcvi

Dates
- Royal assent: 27 July 1857

Text of statute as originally enacted

Staines, Wokingham and Woking Railway Act 1858
- Act of Parliament
- Parliament of the United Kingdom
- Long title: An Act to authorize a Lease of the Staines, Wokingham, and Woking Railway to the London and South-western Railway Company, and for other Purposes connected with the Staines, Wokingham, and Woking Railway Company.
- Citation: 21 & 22 Vict. c. lviii

Dates
- Royal assent: 28 June 1858

Local interests in Staines, northern Surrey and Berkshire, became frustrated at not being connected to the railway network, and in October 1852 they formed the Staines, Wokingham and Woking Railway (SW&WR). They obtained their act of Parliament, the Staines, Wokingham, and Woking Railway Act 1853 (16 & 17 Vict. c. lxxxv), on 8 July 1853, with authorised share capital £300,000. Their line was to run from the LSWR at Staines to join the Reading, Guildford and Reigate Railway (RG&RR) at Wokingham. The RG&RR was sponsored by the South Eastern Railway. There would also be a branch line from Staines to Woking, but in fact this was never built.

The line was opened from Staines to Ascot on 4 June 1856, and on to Wokingham on 9 July 1856. The LSWR worked the line under temporary agreements at first but from 25 March 1858 a 42-year lease was concluded, and then authorised by the Staines, Wokingham and Woking Railway Act 1858 (21 & 22 Vict. c. lviii).

The Reading, Guildford and Reigate Railway had already opened from Reading to Farnborough through Wokingham on 4 July 1849, and the through line from Reading to Reigate Junction (Redhill) was completed later in the year. The SW&WR reached Reading by running powers over the RG&RR. The RG&RR was taken over by the South Eastern Railway by the South Eastern and Reading, Guildford and Reigate Railways Amalgamation Act 1852 (15 & 16 Vict. c. ciii).

=== Curves at Kew and Barnes ===
This arrangement of two reversals for N&SWJR passenger trains between Hampstead Road and Richmond was operationally inconvenient and slow, and the LSWR obtained powers to build an east curve at Kew enabling direct running from the N&SWJR towards Barnes, and a west curve at Barnes, enabling running towards Richmond. These curves opened on 1 February 1862, although the journey time saved was minimal.

=== West London Extension Railway 1863 ===
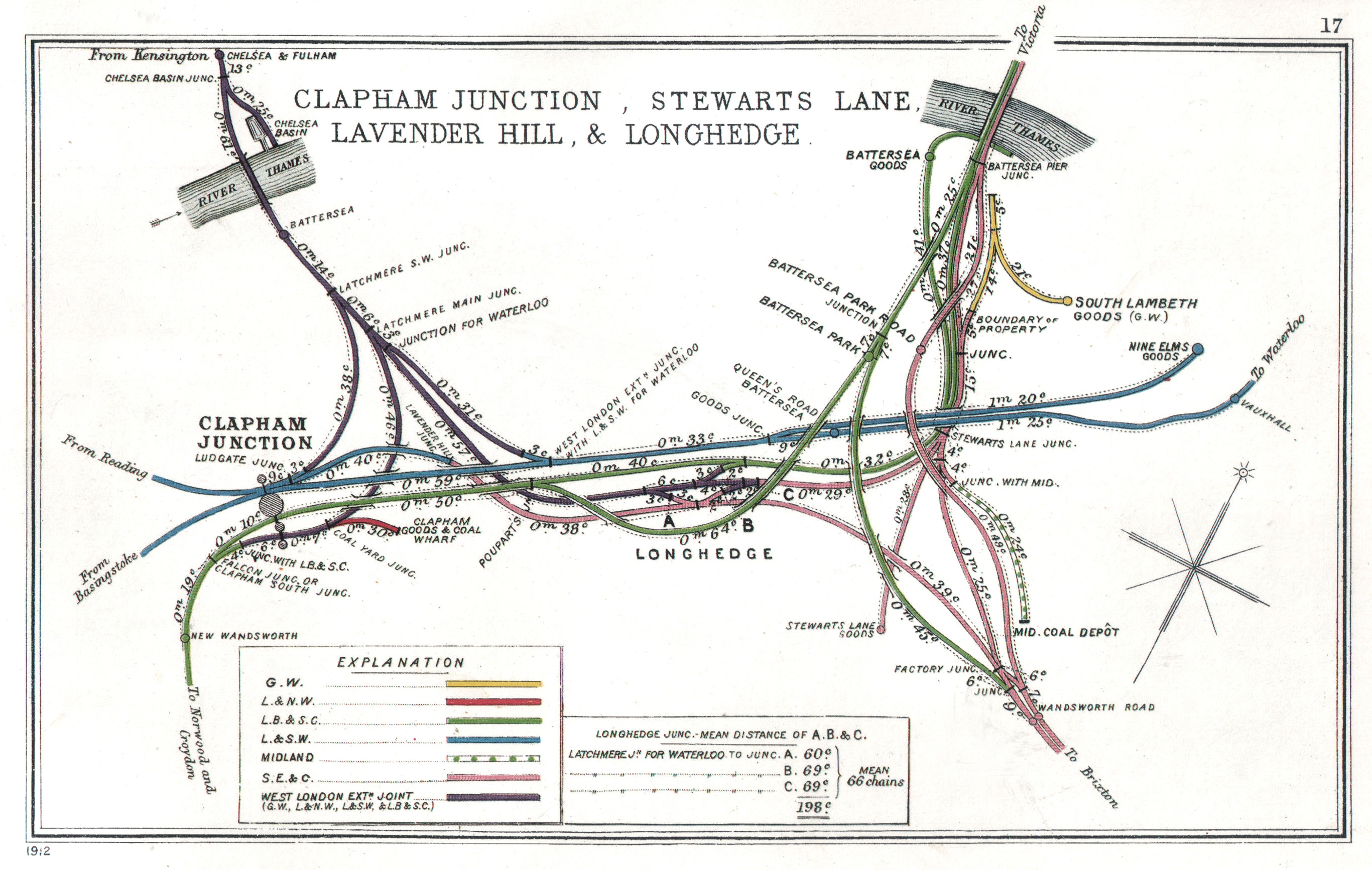
Railway clearing house diagram of railways around Clapham Junction

The West London Railway (WLR) had opened in 1844 from the LNWR and GWR, striking south to a terminus at Kensington. The line failed commercially and was closed, but in 1859 the West London Extension Railway (WLER) was authorised by the West London Extension Railway Act 1859 (22 & 23 Vict. c. cxxxiv); it was to extend south from the WLR at Kensington to make junctions at what became Clapham Junction with the London, Brighton and South Coast Railway, and with the LSWR. The connections to the LSWR were to the Windsor lines towards Barnes (at the future Clapham Junction station) and towards Waterloo (at West London Junction). The WLER was to be jointly owned, the LSWR having a one-sixth share.

The line opened on 2 March 1863, but the Waterloo-facing spur to West London Junction was delayed until 6 July 1865. The West London Railway and the West London Extension Railway were known as the West London Joint Railways.

From that date the LNWR and the LSWR started to operate a service from the LNWR to London Bridge via the WLER and the Windsor Lines to Waterloo, continuing through Waterloo station to the South Eastern Railway. Nine trains ran each weekday from 6 July 1865, worked by LSWR engines between Kensington and London Bridge. From 1 February 1867 these trains from Euston were diverted to Cannon Street instead of London Bridge. The trip round London took 57 minutes, and was not popular. From 1 January 1868 the Euston trains terminated at Waterloo, Windsor line platforms, and on 1 February 1868 the service was ended. It was resumed from Willesden to Waterloo from 1 July 1875 until 31 December 1892, when it was finally discontinued.

== Kingston and Shepperton lines ==
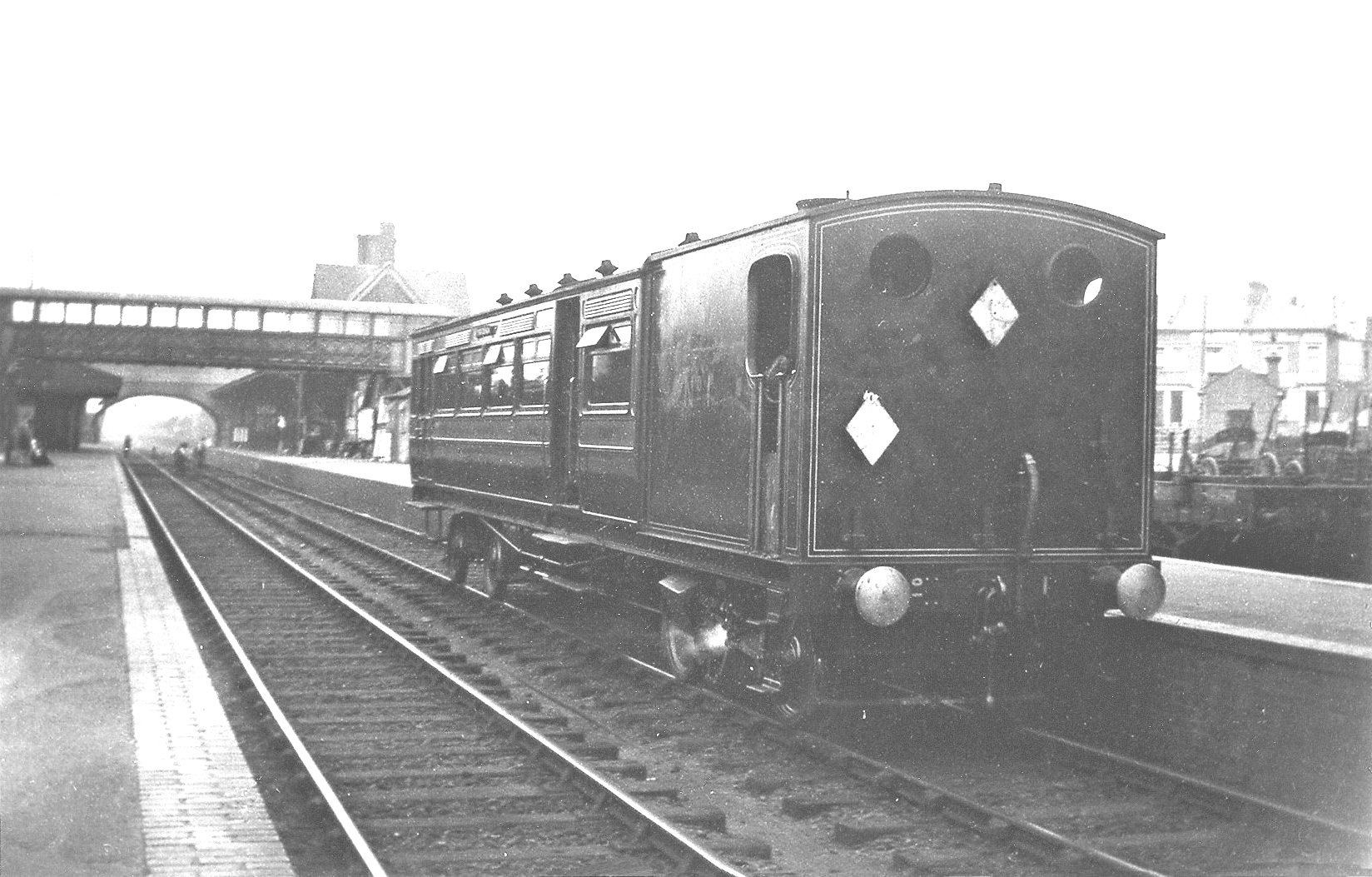
A steam railmotor at Hounslow station in 1910

The LSWR wished to make a branch line to Kingston, from Twickenham. It intended to build it as far as Hampton Wick, on the Middlesex side of Kingston river bridge, but the residents of Kingston petitioned for the branch to be extended as far as their town. The line opened to traffic on 1 July 1863.

The idea of a branch to Shepperton followed, proposed by an independent company, the Thames Valley Railway. The company built the line and sold it to the LSWR. It opened on 1 November 1864 from Thames Valley Junction, on the Kingston line. The site of the junction later became known as Strawberry Hill Junction, when a station of the same name was built there. For the time being all the Shepperton branch traffic ran via Twickenham.

The journey from Kingston to London was very circuitous and the LSWR eventually gave way to pressure, and made a connection to the Woking main line at Malden, much later known as New Malden. This was opened on 1 January 1869 and enabled the operation of a circular train service, from Waterloo to Waterloo via Kingston. For some time the Shepperton branch connection was still only towards Twickenham, but on 1 July 1894 a southward junction was made, completing the triangular connection at Strawberry Hill. At first only goods trains and special trains to and from Kempton Park racecourse used the south connection, but in time this came to be the dominant route for ordinary passenger operation to and from the Shepperton branch.

=== Through Waterloo to the City ===
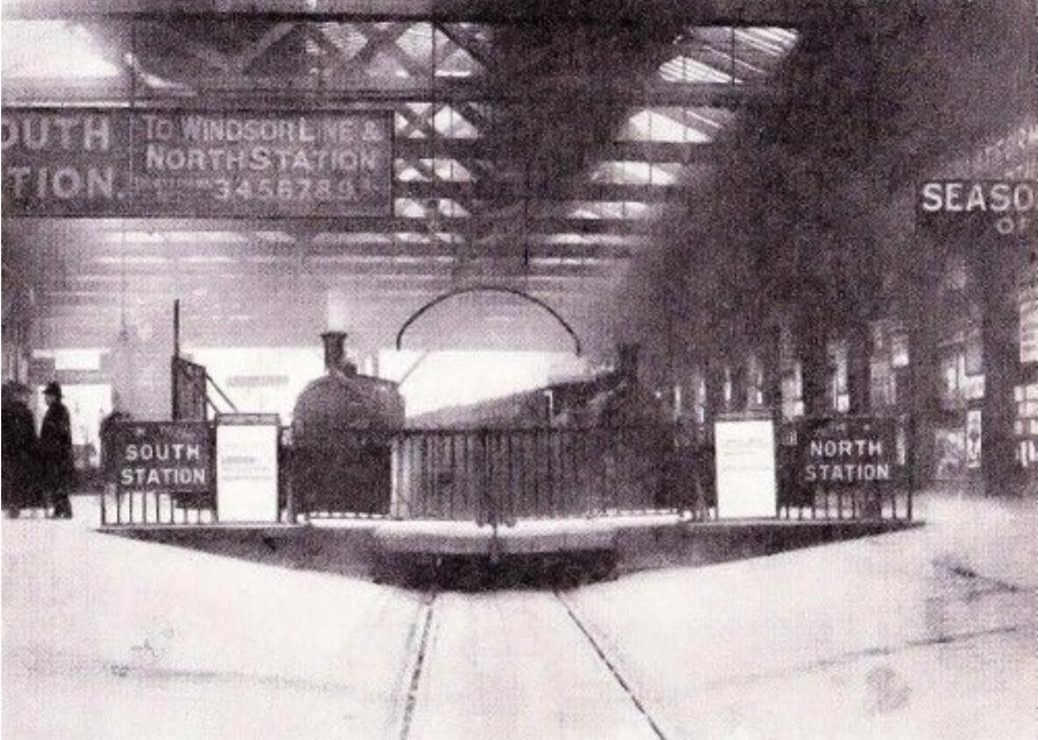
Waterloo station showing the link to the South Eastern Railway

The lack of easy access to the City of London continued to be a sore point with the LSWR and its customers, and an opportunity appeared to arise when the Charing Cross Railway was promoted. It was nominally independent, but very obviously a dependency of the South Eastern Railway (SER). It opened on 11 January 1864, between London Bridge and Charing Cross, but there was no station at Waterloo. The LSWR had managed to get a requirement in the authorising Charing Cross Railway Act 1859 (22 & 23 Vict. c. lxxxi) to construct a connection from it into and through the LSWR Waterloo station, running into the Windsor Lines side. The South Eastern Railway was extremely hostile to the LSWR at this stage and declined to work trains over it, even though the connection was "open". On 1 July 1865 a weekday through service started, worked jointly by the LNWR and South Eastern Railway. It was to run from Euston via Willesden and Kensington over the West London Line to Waterloo and on to London Bridge. Locomotives and guards would be supplied by the LSWR from Kensington.

London Bridge was all very well, but the LSWR wanted to get to Cannon Street, clearly much more useful as a City terminus than London Bridge. In any case the SER was engaged in constant warfare with the LSWR, and any agreement seemed unreachable. The SER demanded that the Kensington to London Bridge service cease on 2 September 1866. The SER was losing money on the service, which was (from its point of view) very unreliable; there may have been political motives connected with an impending alliance with the London, Brighton and South Coast Railway.

Despite earlier obstruction, the SER agreed to a new service to Cannon Street from Willesden and Kensington, starting on 1 February 1867. The engines and guards were changed twice in the ten–mile (16–km) route. The SER announced that the Willesden and Cannon Street service would be discontinued on 1 January 1868. The connection at Waterloo between the LSWR and the SER now had no booked train service, and was never used again, except for the Royal Train and the occasional exchange of horse boxes. The cut back service from Willesden to Waterloo struggled on for a month, and was ended on 1 February 1868. The connection over Waterloo Road was last used on 25 March 1911.

=== Getting to Ludgate Hill ===
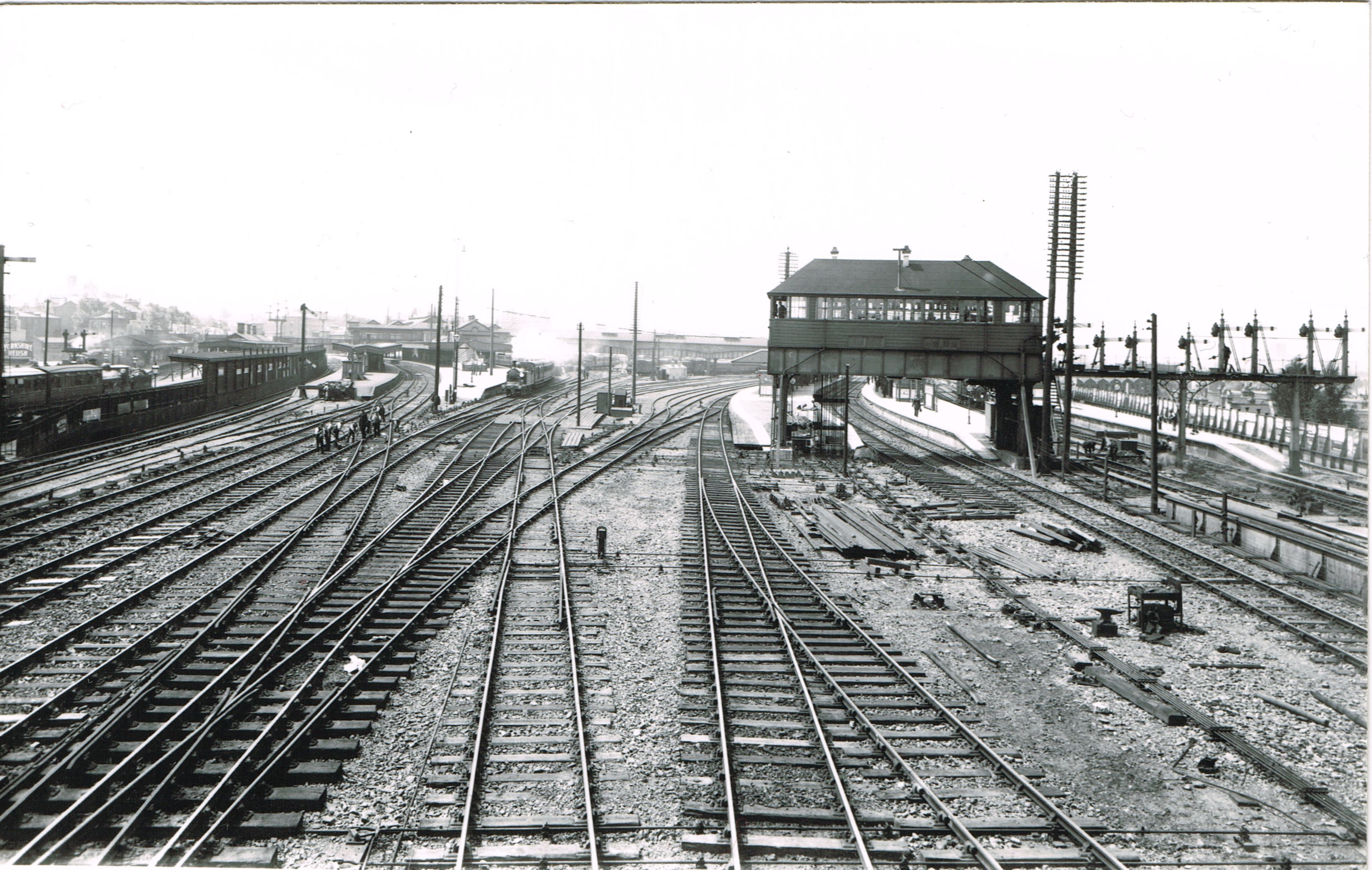
Clapham Junction Windsor Lines station looking west

At the same time the LSWR Was exploring an alternative means of getting trains to the City of London. The London, Chatham and Dover Railway extended its line from Herne Hill to Ludgate Hill in 1864, and it opened a permanent Ludgate Hill station on 1 June 1865. The LCDR was financially embarrassed and was glad to give the LSWR access over its lines, and the LSWR gained use of a station in the City. The LCDR built a connecting line from the Windsor side of Clapham Junction to Factory Junction, near its Wandsworth Road station. This was authorised by the London, Chatham and Dover Railway (City Undertaking) Act 1864 (27 & 28 Vict. c. ccxii) of 25 July 1864.

The connecting line was owned by the LCDR except for 40 chains (800–m) at the Clapham Junction end; mutual running powers operated; the boundary point was called Lavender Hill Junction. From 3 April 1866 LSWR passengers could reach Ludgate Hill by seven weekday trains from Kingston via Richmond and three from Hounslow, although the details of the service were changed after a few months.

=== Kensington and Richmond via Hammersmith ===
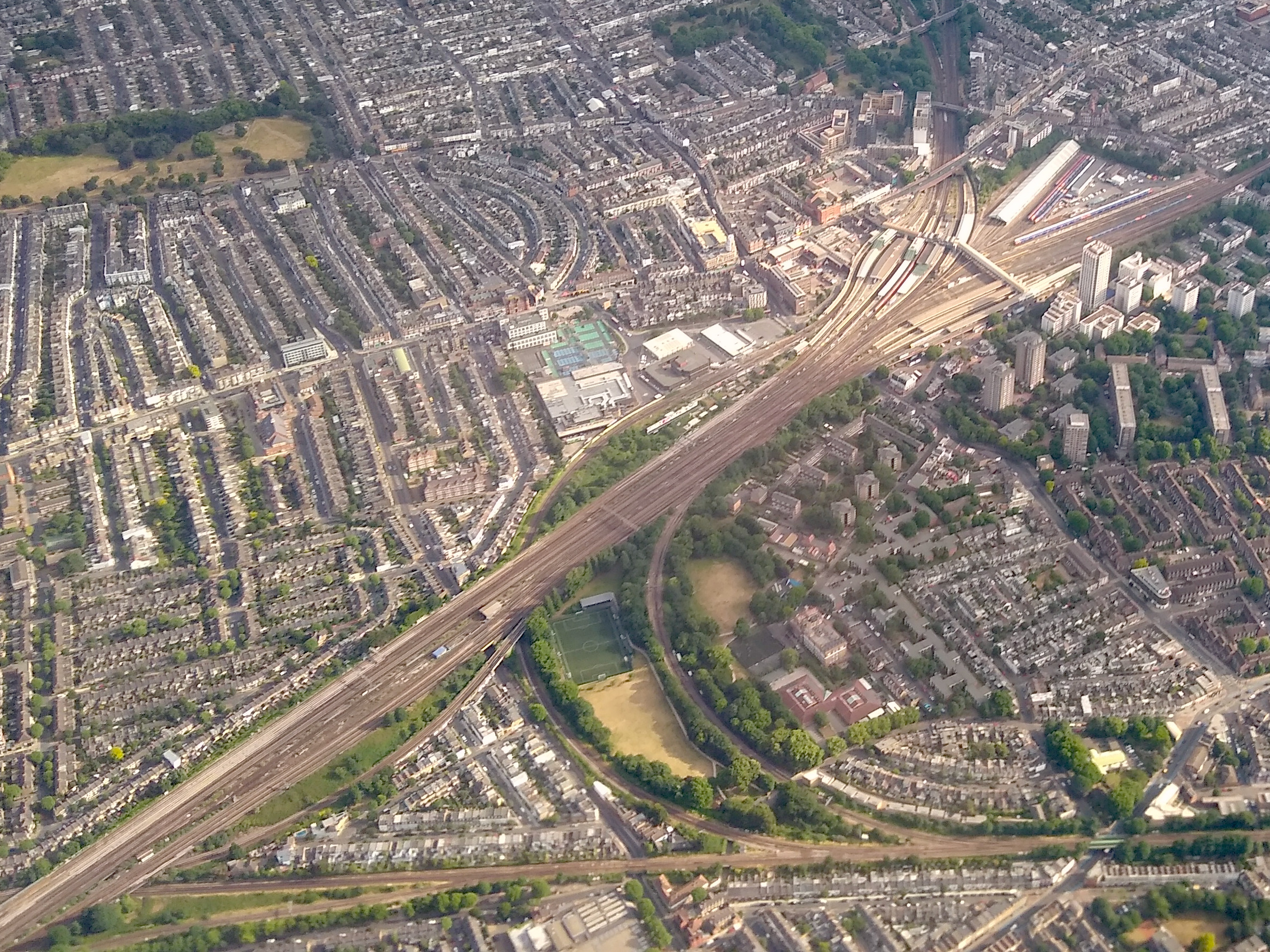
Aerial photograph of Clapham Junction; the line to Waterloo is at bottom left, and from Kensington is at bottom right; the Ludgate Junction to Longhedge Junction line snakes round at bottom centre; the Windsor line platforms are by the tower blocks at the right hand margin

The North and South Western Junction Railway constantly felt vulnerable to the construction of more convenient competing lines, which it did not have the financial resources to resist. The LSWR took part in a meeting with the LNWR and the N&SWJR on 20 August 1863, and it was the LSWR that was made to fell defensive, fearing further incursion into its territory by other companies. As a defensive measure, the company quickly promoted a scheme for a line from Kensington station on the West London Railway, through Hammersmith to a new Richmond terminus. The line was specifically designed to have its own terminal station at Richmond, to discourage other companies from seeking running powers on from there to other parts of the LSWR system. The LSWR obtained authorisation for the line in the London and South-western (Kensington and Richmond) Railway Act 1864 (27 & 28 Vict. c. clxvi) on 14 July 1864, with share capital of £330,000. The act included an obligation to make several connections and other facilities for competing lines, although the South-western Railway (General) Act 1867 (30 & 31 Vict. c. clvi) eliminated some of the more extreme concessions. The line opened on 1 January 1869 between Kensington and Richmond; trains ran from Waterloo to Richmond, via West London and Latchmere Junctions, Kensington and Hammersmith.

The line was rather circuitous, and was of limited attraction to residential travellers. Because of its route through marginal LSWR territory, it made a number of connections to other lines, and was subject to the running over part of its route by competitors. Chief among these was the Metropolitan District Railway which ran over it from Turnham Green to Studland Road Junction, on the approach to Hammersmith. This section was a little under a mile (1 km) long. The District Railway's service, running direct through Westminster and the City of London, became increasingly popular, and the MDR train service grew greatly, completely overwhelming the LSWR service and overwhelming line capacity at Turnham Green.

The situation became intolerable and in 1911 the section of route was quadrupled, the MDR using the southern pair of tracks and the LSWR the northern pair. The LSWR continued to own the route and all four tracks.

The MDR electrified the route in 1905, and further increased its train frequency. At the same time use of the LSWR service declined steeply, as it was seen as slow, due to the roundabout routing to London, infrequent, and dirty by comparison. In 1916 the LSWR discontinued the train service, and the section from Studland Road Junction to the junction with the West London Line at Kensington closed completely. The District Railway was able to take advantage of the situation, and the tracks were re-arranged so that all four tracks were available for the Underground trains exclusively, apart from a few coal trains.

This part of the route remained Southern Railway, later British Railways, property until 1950 when it was transferred to the London Transport Executive. The route from Turnham Green to Richmond remained in Southern Railway ownership, carrying trains from the North London line, operated now by the London, Midland and Scottish Railway, and the District Line.

=== Putney to Wimbledon Line ===
In 1880 the Metropolitan District Railway opened a line from West Brompton to a station in Fulham, named Putney Bridge and Fulham. The alignment of the terminus made it obvious that the next step was to bridge the Thames and strike south.

The District company was contemplating the next move when a projected company calling itself the Guildford, Kingston and London Railway promoted an independent line from Guildford through Surbiton and Kingston to Fulham, and hoping to obtain running powers from there through the District Railway line to the City of London. Both the LSWR and the District Railway were violently opposed to this, and they joined forced to oppose it in Parliament. The opposition was successful, and the LSWR undertook to build a line from Putney Bridge station on the north bank of the River Thames, to Wimbledon. The Metropolitan District Railway formed a connection at Putney Bridge, and the line was operated jointly, although owned by the LSWR. A connection was made for LSWR trains to descend from the new line to the Richmond line, facing London. It was intended that the double track spur would cross the Barnes line and join it by a double junction from the north side of the line, but the quadrupling of the Barnes line, inaugurated in 1887, made this undesirable. In consequence, the up line only of the spur ran on the north side of the Barnes line, the down line connection being on the south side.

The change was made within existing limits of deviation and no specific powers were taken, but Major-General Hutchinson on his inspection for the Board of Trade said that if doubts arose formal powers should be obtained in a future act of Parliament; it seems was never done. The District Railway operated on the line from 3 June 1889, and the LSWR, never running across the Thames Bridge, started a service from Waterloo to Wimbledon via East Putney from 1 July 1889.

== Infrastructure improvements ==
=== Plough Lane Level Crossing ===
Between Clapham and Barnes, where growing traffic demanded improvements, powers obtained in the South-western Railway (General) Act 1873 (36 & 37 Vict. c. clxi) on 21 July 1873 allowed the level crossing at Plough Lane (now Plough Road) west of Clapham Junction to be eliminated, by deviating the line northwards from 5 chains (100 m; 330 ft) east of Falcon Lane to 10 chains (200 m; 660 ft) west of the crossing and then bridging Plough Lane. It came into use in March 1876.

A railway (Battersea Line No. 1) 4 furlongs and 4 chains or thereabouts in length, wholly in the parish of St. Mary, Battersea, in the county of Surrey, commencing by a junction with the Richmond and Windsor line of railway of the Company, at a point about 5 chains eastwards from Falcon Lane Bridge, and terminating by a junction with the same line of railway at a point about 10 chains westward from Plough Lane. — Section 4, South-western Railway (General) Act 1873 (36 & 37 Vict. c. clxi)

The bridge for carrying the railway over Plough Lane shall be a girder bridge with one clear span of not less than forty feet throughout, measured on the square, and with a clear headway of not less than fifteen feet for the entire width of such bridge, and the said bridge shall be formed of an ornamental character to the reasonable satisfaction of the engineer of the Metropolitan Board of Works, and on the completion of the said bridge the present crossing of Plough Lane on the level shall be discontinued, and on the opening of the railway for public traffic the Company shall for ever thereafter abandon the use of the surface of that lane for the purposes of their undertaking. — Section 8, South-western Railway (General) Act 1873 (36 & 37 Vict. c. clxi)

=== St Margarets and Twickenham ===
Public pressure secured a station for St Margarets, which opened on 2 October 1876. The junction at Twickenham was converted to a flyover for up trains on 22 October 1883. Between Twickenham East and St Margarets an additional up line came into use on 26 November 1899.

=== Feltham curve ===
For many years Hounslow residents had sought a direct link with Twickenham. This was provided by a 29–chain (580 m) curve forming a triangular junction between Hounslow Junction and Whitton Junction on the Windsor line. It was opened for traffic on 1 January 1883 and was authorised retrospectively by the South Western Railway (Various Powers) Act 1883 (46 & 47 Vict. c. clxxxix) of 20 August 1883.

A Railway (the Feltham Curve) 2 furlongs and 9.05 chains or thereabouts in length in the parish of Twickenham and county of Middlesex commencing by a junction with the Company's loop line between Hounslow and Feltham Junction and terminating by a junction with the Company's Richmond and Windsor line. — Section 6, South Western Railway (Various Powers) Act 1883 (46 & 47 Vict. c. clxxxix)

=== Gunnersbury roundabout ===
On 1 January 1883 the LSWR began a Gunnersbury to Gunnersbury service via the Chiswick Curve, Hounslow, Feltham Curve, Richmond and Kew Gardens. The initial eight weekdays-only trains each way increased in February 1883 to fifteen and seven on Sundays, but from 1 November 1883 they ran only between Gunnersbury and Twickenham via Hounslow.

=== Staines new station and curve ===
On 1 July 1884 a north-to-west curve was built at Staines enabling through running from Windsor towards Egham. The Royal Train became a frequent user, but there was an ordinary train service in addition, which for some time ran to Woking. Staines was important enough to warrant the opening of a station on the Windsor leg of the triangular junction named Staines High Street. It opened on the same day as the curve and closed on 1 July 1884. The west curve was abandoned on 22 March 1965.

== Electrification ==
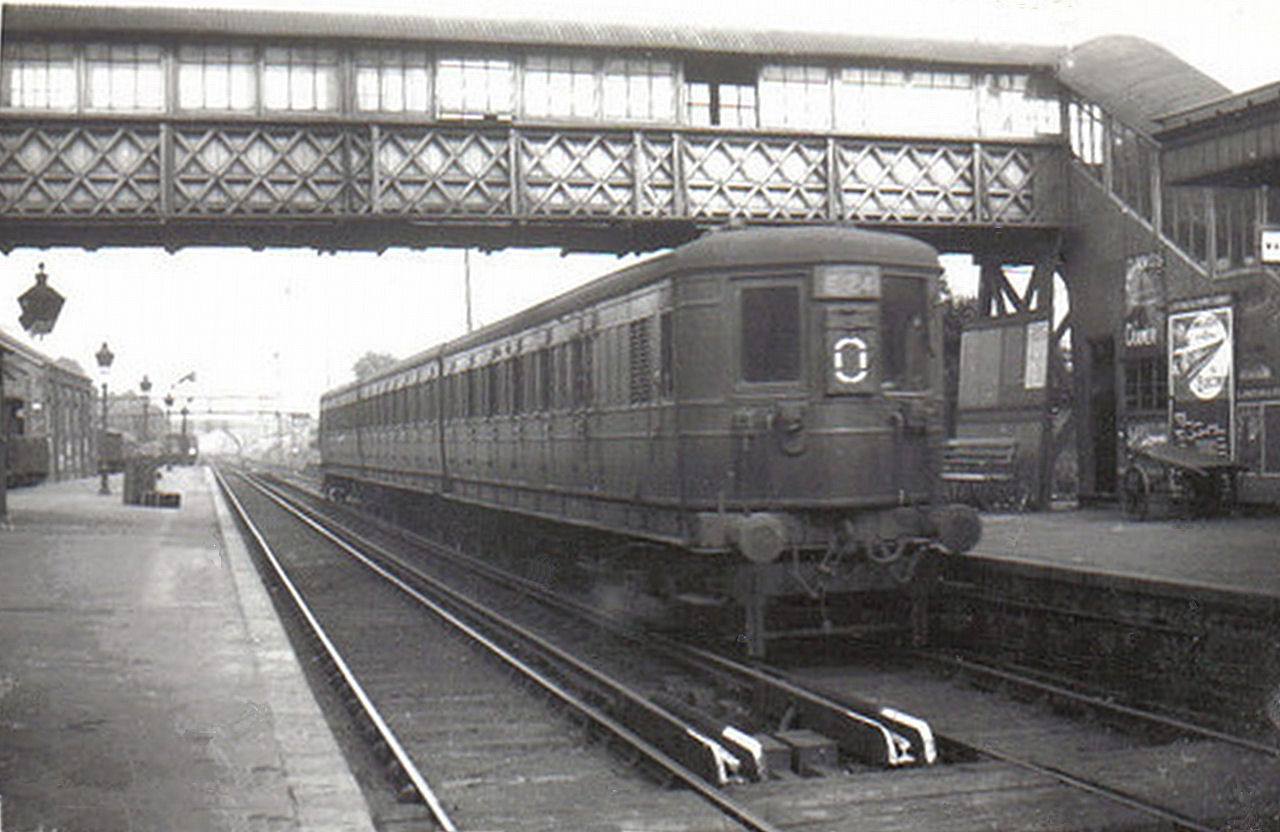
An electric train at Hounslow

In 1913 the LSWR decided to embark on a scheme to electrify its suburban network, progressively. It adopted a third rail system at 600 V . The proposals of the chairman Walker and his electrical engineer Jones to electrify the principal suburban lines of the LSWR were adopted by the Board early in 1913. The scheme was to be divided into two stages: stage one was to involve inner suburban routes, including Waterloo to Twickenham via Richmond and via Hounslow, as well as the Kingston and Shepperton lines, and the Wimbledon branch from Point Pleasant Junction. Stage two was to deal with outer suburban routes, and would extend stage one from Twickenham and Hounslow to Windsor.

Stage one started operation from Waterloo to Wimbledon via Point Pleasant on 25 October 1915. Waterloo to Twickenham, and Kingston and Shepperton was added on 30 January 1916, and the Hounslow line was operational from 12 March 1916.

Stage two was deferred due to the exigencies of World War I, and it was not until 6 July 1930 that the line from Whitton Junction and Hounslow Junction to Windsor was commissioned.

== Feltham marshalling yard ==
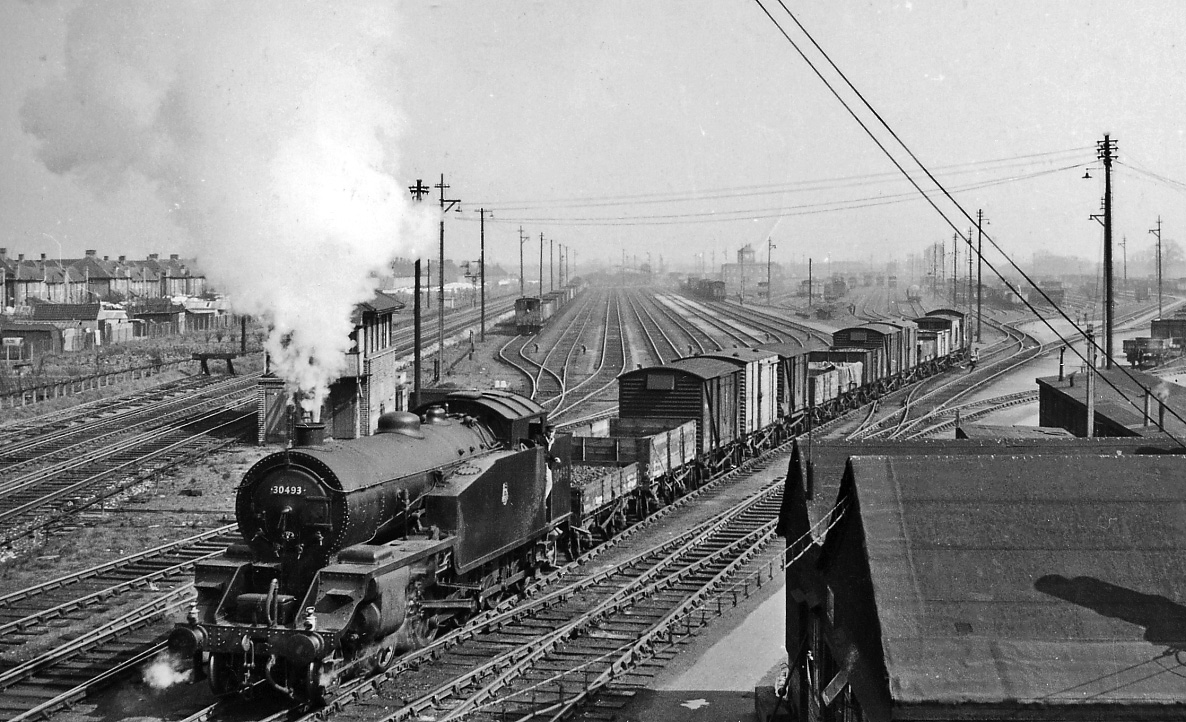
Feltham Marshalling Yard, with a G16 locomotive

In the first years of the twentieth century the LSWR's handling of goods and mineral traffic in the London area was highly unsatisfactory. There was no concentration yard near London, and in fact the LSWR maintained staff at Brent on the Midland Railway to conduct a primary sort there for inward traffic. Coal was an especially heavy flow and approached from the Midland, but also from the London and North Western via Willesden, and the Great Central Railway, Great Northern Railway and Great Eastern Railways, the latter flow having used the GN&GE Joint Line. In addition there was the domestic flow to and from Nine Elms, which had to be handled separately from the "foreign" flows.

The search for a site for a marshalling yard started in 1900, but it was not until 1911 that definite arrangements were made to construct a yard at Feltham. The location had some challenges, in particular three large watercourses which ran through it and needed to be culverted. German prisoners of war were engaged on some of the work. In February 1917 eight sidings were built to relieve pressure on the Brent yard. The siding complex at Feltham was gradually increased, for a long time only dealing with domestic flows, but from May 1921 nine trains daily ran to Willesden; the up yard came into full operation on 2 October 1921.

The Feltham location had the advantage of taking goods traffic off the busy main line; trains approaching from the west took the Byfleet curve and ran via Chertsey. Furthermore Feltham was not far from Kew, with an easy connection towards the north of the Thames. The yard would occupy a considerable workforce and housing provision needed to be made for them. Land was obtained off Bedfont Lane in January 1922 and a staff village of 80 houses and 48 flats was constructed at a cost of £77,000. The total cost including the locomotive depot and housing exceeded £550,000.

== The Southern Railway ==
In 1923 the Southern Railway was established, by the amalgamation of the London and South Western Railway, the London, Brighton and South Coast Railway, and the South Eastern and Chatham Railway, as well as a number of smaller concerns. The process was known as the "grouping" of the railways, following the Railways Act 1921. The railways to the north of the River Thames went through a corresponding process, the Midland Railway and the London and North Western Railway together (with others) forming the new London Midland and Scottish Railway. The Windsor Line was consequently still at the northern frontier of its parent company's area, and interchange traffic with the LMS was broadly similar to what had gone before, modified by the establishment of Feltham Yard.

== Staines West branch line ==
The line from West Drayton to Colnbrook was opened on 9 August 1884, by an independent company affiliated to the Great Western Railway (GWR). The branch was extended to its own station at Staines on 2 November 1885.

A short link was installed during World War II between the ex-LSWR Windsor branch and the GWR line. The purpose was to enable diversion of goods traffic away from the conventional routes to London. It was brought into service in September 1940 primarily to provide an alternative route from the LNER and GWR Joint line via High Wycombe. Southern Railway locomotives worked the trains from Northolt Junction via the Greenford loop to Hanwell and West Drayton, and from there over the Staines branch to Virginia Water, Guildford and Redhill.

The line closed to passengers on 29 March 1965. When the M25 motorway was being built at the beginning of the 1980s, it was necessary to sever the branch. To continue a freight connection to a private siding at Staines (former GWR station), a link was laid in between it and the ex-LSWR line; it was available from 16 January 1981 until 24 June 1991.

== Nationalisation ==
In 1948 the main line railways of Great Britain were nationalised, following the Transport Act 1947.

== Eurostar ==
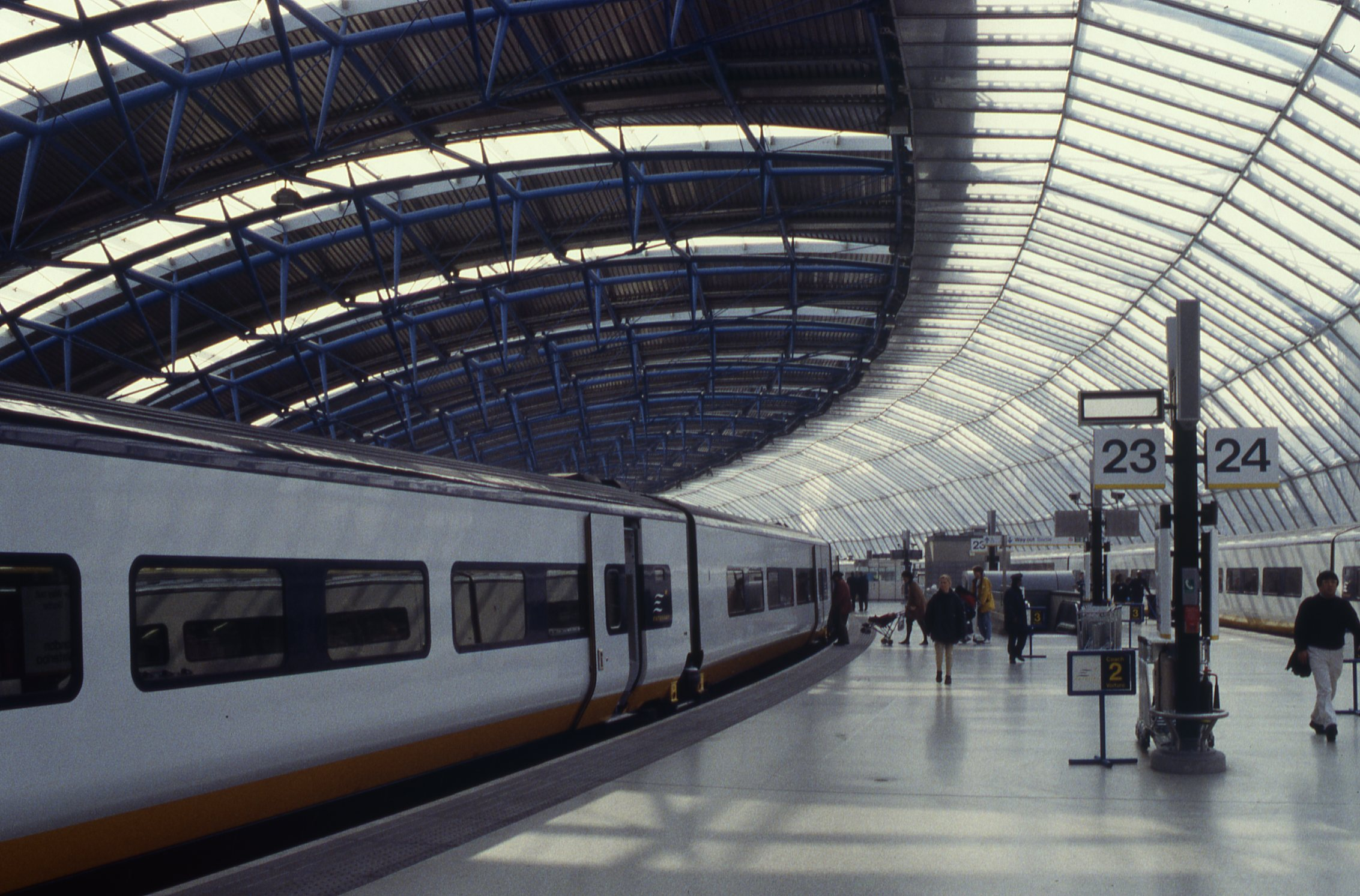
Waterloo International station in 1996

In 1994 the Eurostar service started operation; this was an international passenger train service from Waterloo to Paris and Brussels. The Windsor Lines station at Waterloo had been heavily redeveloped to provide very long platforms for the new trains, the platform lines merging with the conventional tracks at International Junction, outside the station. The trains operated on the Windsor lines as far as Nine Elms Junction, then curving round on a new viaduct to Linford Street Junction on the former LCDR line from Victoria, approaching Wandsworth Road station. continuing from there to Ashford and the Channel Tunnel. The first train operated into Waterloo International on 22 December 1993.

The empty stock was serviced at North Pole Junction, adjacent to the former Great Western main line at Old Oak Common. Access for the empty trains was from Waterloo via West London Junction, Latchmere Junction and the West London Line. The curve to from West London Junction, known as the Sheepcote Curve, had been closed in 1936, but was reinstated for the Eurostar empty trains, from 17 August 1994. As well as the empty stock usage there was a Eurostar connecting service to Cardiff which started on 24 October 1994, but ceased on 25 May 2004. On 14 November 2007 the Eurostar services were transferred to London St Pancras International, and the Sheepcote Curve was no longer required operationally.

== The present day ==
The Windsor line continues at the present day with its distinct identity; the commuter passenger service is dominant; Feltham marshalling yard has been closed and wagonload freight no longer runs. The cross-London goods traffic continues, but in considerably reduced volume.

== Locations ==
=== Main line ===
- Windsor; temporary station opened 1 December 1849; permanent station opened 1 May 1851; renamed Windsor & Eton 10 December 1903; renamed Windsor & Eton Riverside 26 September 1949; still open;
- Datchet; opened 22 August 1848; still open;

Sunnymeads;

- Wraysbury; opened 22 August 1848; relocated 1 April 1861; still open;
- Staines High Street; opened 1 July 1884; closed 30 January 1916;
- Staines High Street Junction; forming triangular junction with West Junction towards Virginia Water 7 April 1877 to 18 March 1965;
- Staines East Junction; as above;
- Staines; opened 22 August 1848; still open; renamed Staines Central 26 September 1949; renamed Staines 18 April 1966; still open;
- Ashford; opened 22 August 1848; still open;
- Feltham; opened 22 August 1848; still open;
- Feltham Junction; forming triangular junction with Hounslow Junction from 1 January 1883;
- Whitton Junction; as above;
- Whitton; opened 6 July 1930; still open;
- Twickenham; opened 22 August 1848; still open;
- St Margarets; opened 2 October 1876; still open;
- Richmond; opened 27 July 1846; through station opened 22 August 1848; still open;
- North Sheen; opened 6 July 1930; still open;
- Mortlake; opened 27 July 1846; still open;
- Mortlake Junction; forming triangular junction with Chiswick Junction from 1 February 1862 to 1 January 1869;
- Barnes Junction; as above;
- Barnes; opened 27 July 1846; still open;
- Putney; opened 27 July 1846; still open;
- Point Pleasant Junction; convergence to Wimbledon line from 1 July 1889;
- Wandsworth; opened 27 July 1846; renamed Wandsworth Town 7 October 1903; still open;
- Clapham Junction; opened 2 March 1863; still open;
- Queens Road Battersea; opened 1 November 1877; renamed Queenstown Road Battersea 12 May 1980; still open;
- Ludgate Junction; divergence towards Longhedge Junction;
- West London Junction; convergence from Latchmere Junction;
- Vauxhall; opened 11 July 1848; still open;
- Waterloo; main station opened 11 July 1848; Windsor Lines station opened 3 August 1860; combined 1 October 1912; still open.

=== Hounslow loop ===
- Feltham Junction; above;
- Hounslow Junction; forming triangular junction with Whitton Junction; above;
- Hounslow; opened 1 February 1850; still open;
- Isleworth; opened 1 February 1850; still open;
- Smallberry Green; temporary terminus, opened 22 August 1849; closed 1 February 1850;
- Syon Lane; opened 5 July 1931; still open;
- Brentford; opened 22 August 1849; renamed Brentford Central 5 June 1950; renamed Brentford 12 May 1980; still open;
- Old Kew Junction; forming triangular junction with New Kew Junction (below) and Kew East Junction towards Acton N&SWJR;
- Kew; opened 22 August 1849; renamed Kew Bridge 1 January 1869; still open;
- New Kew Junction; forming Kew Curve to Kew East Junction, 1 February 1862 to 12 September 1942;
- Chiswick Junction; facing junction to Chiswick curve, towards Gunnersbury 1 June 1870 to 24 July 1932;
- Chiswick; opened 22 Auguist 1849; still open;
- Barnes Bridge; opened 12 March 1916;
- Barnes (above).
