= London's last tram week =

London's last tram week refers to the last full week of operation of London's first-generation street tram system, (Note: The first generation of trams in London was the original system that grew up in the Victorian era, as distinct from the current generation of modern trams that started with the opening of Tramlink in 2000.) from 29 June to 5 July 1952. It was the culmination of a three-year programme, known as Operation Tramaway, that saw the replacement of south London's entire tram network with a fleet of modern diesel buses, at a cost of £10 million. The trams had been very popular among Londoners, and in south London they accounted for the majority of local journeys by public transport. Many people regarded their demise as a particularly momentous event. On the last day of operation, large crowds gathered to see the last trams in service and to take a final ride. On arrival at its depot, the very last tram was ceremoniously received by a group of dignitaries, watched by a large number of spectators.

== Background ==
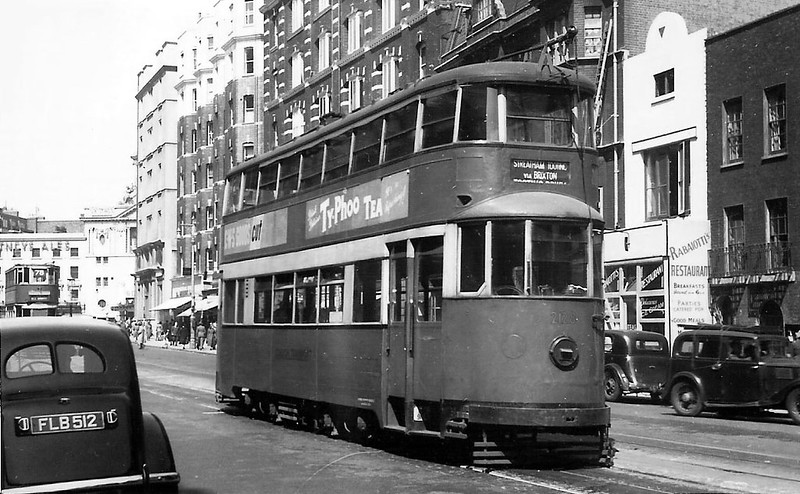
A London tram car of the "Feltham" type, common on south London streets in the post-war era.

Street tramways in London date from 1861, when the American entrepreneur, George Francis Train, launched two speculative horse-drawn routes in the city. These aroused considerable hostility among local residents, and because the rails projected above the surface of the road, were considered a danger to other road users. The services were withdrawn in June 1862 after Train was prosecuted for damaging the highway.

In 1870, Parliament passed the Tramways Act, which provided a legal framework for the construction and operation of tramways. It required trams to run in grooved rails flush with the road surface, thus allowing other vehicles to share the routes. The Act allowed local authorities to grant concessions to tramway operators, who would construct the tracks and maintain the public highway.

The Tramways Act stimulated the construction of new tram routes throughout London. By 1880, there were 63 miles (101 km) of track, with 479 cars and 4,178 horses. Some 64 million passengers were carried that year. The lines all used a standard gauge of 4 ft 8½ in (1,435 mm; the same as the standard railway gauge) to permit inter-company working.

In 1901, electric trams started to replace horse-drawn vehicles. The first electric service was operated by London United Tramways (LUT) in Shepherd's Bush, Kew and Acton. In 1903, London County Council (LCC) electrified its line from Westminster and Blackfriars bridges to Tooting. In contrast to the LUT system, which relied on overhead wires for its power supply, the LCC line drew power from a conduit sunk between the rails.

Electric trams were popular with Londoners, ridership was high and the system expanded rapidly. In 1911, two out of every three public transport journeys were made by tram. By 1914, the London tram network was the largest in Europe. In 1933, the London Passenger Transport Board (LPTB) was established to operate local public transport in London. The Board acquired 167 miles (269 km) of track from the LCC, and a further 92 miles (148 km) from other operators.

But despite its popularity, the system suffered serious drawbacks. The routes were inflexible, and, because of the high capital costs involved, could not economically be extended to serve new suburbs. Maintenance of the tracks was also expensive. Trams were also seen as a cause of traffic congestion, especially in London's narrow streets. Sometimes the trams themselves were caught in congestion, for example if one broke down and none behind could pass it. Long hold-ups occurred every time there was an accident, for instance when the wheels of a horse-cart got trapped in the tram tracks on Westminster Bridge in 1937. Motorcyclists and car drivers also found the rails hazardous, particularly on rainy days. From the early 1920s, the trams faced competition from diesel buses, whose capital cost per seat was about half that of the trams and whose running cost per vehicle-mile (in London) was about 20% lower.

In 1931, the LUT converted 17 of its route miles (27 km) to trolleybuses. These proved more popular than the trams, with ridership increasing by 25% on some of the routes. Between 1935 and 1940, the LPTB converted nearly all of the tram routes north of the Thames to trolleybuses, and several in south London too, including in Bexleyheath and Sutton. When the conversion programme was paused in 1940 because of World War II, the only tram routes remaining were those south of the Thames and three cross-river routes that used the Kingsway Tunnel. According to Prince Marshall, if it had not been for the war, trams would have disappeared from London's streets by 1945.

== Operation Tramaway ==
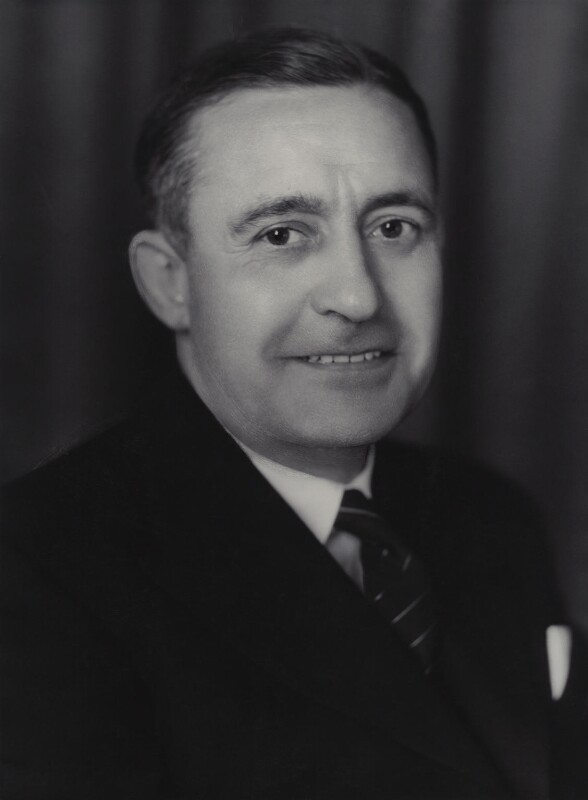
Lord Latham, chairman of the London Transport Executive who oversaw Operation Tramaway.

The LPTB's first annual report after the war referred to "the urgent necessity for replacing trams in south London by a more modern and attractive form of transport". In 1946, the Board announced that the remaining trams would be replaced by diesel buses rather than trolleybuses. This was partly because the power-generating plant used by both trams and trolleybuses was nearing the end of its life, and partly because the economics of bus operation was moving in favour of diesel rather than electric.

In 1949, Lord Latham, chairman of the London Transport Executive (Note: This was the replacement body of the LPTB. Both organisations were commonly known as London Transport.), announced that the replacement of the remaining trams by buses would begin in October 1950 and would cost £10 million. Because it was constrained by the supply of new vehicles and of garage accommodation, it would be carried out in stages over the next three years. The programme was code-named Operation Tramaway.

== The last day ==
Goodbye to the Trams. Positively your last chance to ride or take your children on a London tram. They cease to run after Saturday night.

— London Transport press advertisement

The replacement programme reached its conclusion at the beginning of July 1952, with the fifth of that month, a Saturday, designated as the final day of tram operation in London. (Note: Some late-night services in fact terminated in the early hours of the following morning, Sunday 6 July.) The event was widely foreshadowed in the press. Conductors issued souvenir tickets lettered, "Last Tram Week July 1952". The trams themselves carried posters reading, "Last Tram Week. On 5 July we say Goodbye to London." The Kingsway tramway subway closed three months earlier, in April.

Many Londoners regarded the disappearance of the trams as a particularly momentous event. On the final day, the trams were crowded with passengers wanting to take a last ride, with many more people lining the routes to say goodbye to the vehicles. Souvenir hunters stripped everything that could easily be removed from the cars. On the last days of operation, the vehicles had words scrawled on them in chalk by the public, including "Rest In Peace", "You Served Us Well", "Old Faithful", "Buses Will Never Get Through the Fog" and "With Love From Croydon".

The very last tram was car no. 1951, running on the 5-mile (8.0 km) Route 40 from Woolwich to New Cross via Charlton and Greenwich. From New Cross to Greenwich it was driven by Driver Albert Fuller. At Greenwich, the Mayor of Deptford, F. J. Morris, took over the controls. John Cliff, a former tram driver from Leeds who was now deputy chairman of London Transport, drove the car for the final leg of the route into the New Cross depot. The journey was delayed by crowds of cheering spectators (20,000 of them, according to one report) who surrounded it along its route and followed it to the depot, accompanied by singing, music and fireworks.

On its arrival at the depot, the tram was welcomed by a delegation of dignitaries led by Lord Latham and including Edwin Bayliss, chairman of the LCC, and the mayors of the nine boroughs that were affected by the conversion programme. A large crowd of spectators had also gathered in the depot. In a speech, Lord Latham said, "In the name of Londoners and London Transport, I say goodbye, old tram,". He said that the trams had taken "an honourable place in the history of the metropolis" and had given the Londoner "seven-league boots". The crowd then sang Auld Lang Syne and gave three cheers.

== Aftermath ==
London Transport leaflet advertising the change in services.

Once the replacement programme was completed, most of the tram cars were scrapped, although about 90 of them were transferred to Leeds, where they gave several more years of service. A few of the cars were preserved and are now on display at the London Transport Museum and the National Tramway Museum. The trolleybuses that had replaced the trams north of the Thames were themselves replaced by diesel buses between 1959 and 1962.

The withdrawal of tram services in London was generally considered successful in reducing traffic congestion, at least in the short term. According to various press reports, traffic now flowed freely at what had previously been the worst bottlenecks. Some journeys by public transport were also noticeably faster. Lord Latham wrote, "The changes in traffic conditions at a number of key points are little short of dramatic." A decrease in road accidents was also reported.
