= Aldwych tramway station =

Former tram stop in London, England

General information
- Location: Holborn, London, UK, Camden; United Kingdom
- Coordinates: 51.513778°N 0.117944°W
- Grid reference: TQ305811
- Platforms: 2

Other information
- Status: Disused

History
- Original company: London County Council Tramways

Key dates
- 24 February 1906: Opened
- 6 April 1952: Closed

Aldwych tramway station (separate from Aldwych Underground station) was a tram stop underneath Kingsway, a road in central London, England. It was built in 1906 by the London County Council Tramways as part of the Kingsway tramway subway, joining the separate networks of tramways in North and South London.

== Services ==
Tram services commenced on 24 February 1906, running from Angel through Holborn, the other station in the tram subway, to Aldwych. Through services across London began on 10 April 1908, running from Highbury station through Holborn and then east to Tower Bridge or south to Kennington Gate.

Following the decision to withdraw tram services in London and replace them with buses, the station closed just after 12.30am on 6 April 1952.

== Redevelopment ==
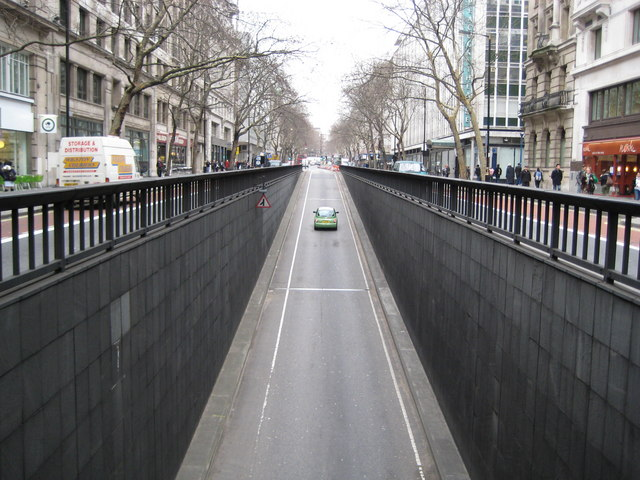
The exit of the Strand Underpass. The former Aldwych subway station was around here.

In 1964, the Strand Underpass, a road tunnel, was opened to alleviate northbound traffic flow from Waterloo Bridge to Kingsway. The underpass took over a section of the tram subway, and rises at its north end through the site of the former Holborn tramway station. No sign of either of the former stations is visible on the surface or from the road tunnel.
