= Royal Commission on Metropolitan Railway Termini =

Former royal commission of the United Kingdom

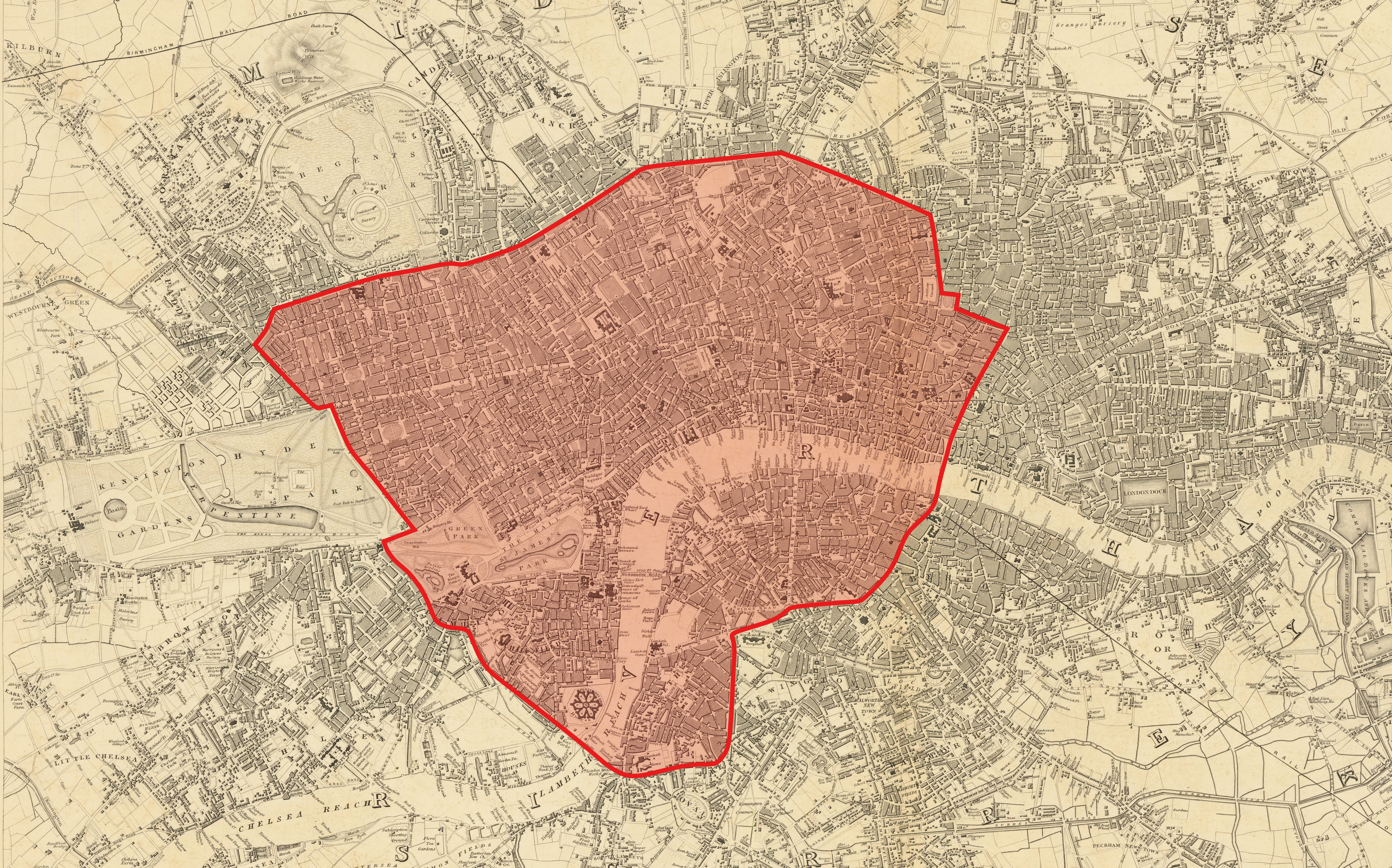
Map of London in 1836 overlaid with the area confirmed by the Royal Commission into which railways should be prevented from entering

The Royal Commission to Investigate the Various Projects for Establishing Railway Termini Within or in the Immediate Vicinity of the Metropolis (usually referred to as the Royal Commission on Metropolitan Railway Termini) was a royal commission established in 1846 with a remit to review and report on railway termini in London.

The commission recommended that lines north of the River Thames should be prevented from entering the central area. The absence of rail connections contributed to the creation of the Metropolitan Railway, the first part of the London Underground.

== Establishment ==
The Royal Commission on Metropolitan Railway Termini was established on 2 April 1846. It had five commissioners:

- Viscount Canning
- Earl of Dalhousie
- John Johnson, Lord Mayor of London
- J. C. Herries, MP for Harwich
- Sir J. M. F. Smith, former Inspector General of Railways

== Remit and investigation ==
The royal commission was established by Parliament to examine proposals for railway terminals in central London and advise if any should be allowed to be constructed within an area that parliament had proposed as a railway-free zone. At the time, Britain was in the midst of railway mania with 435 bills submitted for parliamentary consideration in England and Wales with nineteen new lines and termini proposed for London.

The commission's remit was limited to evaluating proposed lines that came into the urban area bounded by Edgware Road, New Road (now Old Marylebone Road, Marylebone Road, Euston Road, Pentonville Road), City Road, Finsbury Square, Bishopsgate Street, London Bridge, Borough High Street, Blackman Street, Borough Road, Lambeth Road, Vauxhall Road (now Kennington Road, Kennington Lane), Vauxhall Bridge Road, Grosvenor Place and Park Lane.

Within the area under consideration the nineteen proposed new lines and termini were identified as:

North Side of the River Thames

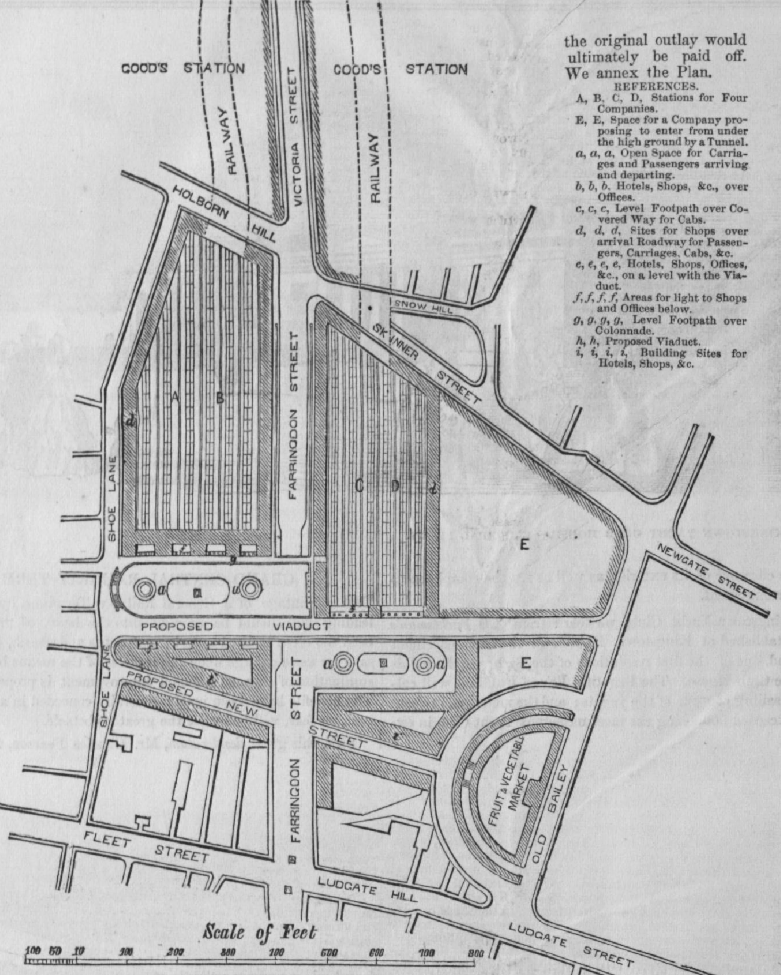
Plan for the Central Terminus, proposed by Charles Pearson as a shared terminus for railways entering the City of London from the north

1. Extension of the Eastern Counties Railway to Finsbury Circus. A short extension from its existing terminus at Shoreditch.
2. Extension of the Eastern Counties Railway to Fore Street. An alternative extension of the railway arriving into the City from the north to a terminus in Moorfields.
3. The Tottenham and Farringdon Street Railway. A proposed branch of the Eastern Counties Railway to a terminus at Farringdon Street on the site of the Fleet Prison.
4. A terminus for the London and Birmingham Railway at Farringdon Street. An extension from Camden Town primarily for goods traffic to a terminus in the same location as 3 above.
5. The London and Manchester Direct Railway and an extension to the City. A main terminus at Battle Bridge (now Kings Cross) with a separate branch to two termini to each side of Farringdon Street.
6. The North London Junction Railway. A railway to connect Paddington station to the City with a terminus near Fore Street as 2 above.
7. The Regent's Canal Railway. A railway to run along the Regent's Canal from Paddington to the River Thames at Limehouse with a branch from Islington to a terminus in the City near the General Post Office at St. Martin's Le Grand.
8. The Direct Northern Railway terminus at Holborn between Gray's Inn Road and Leather Lane.
9. The extension of the London and Birmingham Railway to the West and East India Docks. A goods line outside of the commission's designated area running from Camden Town to Hackney Wick and then south to the Docks.
10. The Central Terminus in Farringdon Street. A proposal for a central railway terminus to be shared by multiple railway companies entering the City from the north.
11. The Great Western, Brentford, and Central Terminus Junction Railway. A railway from Charing Cross running on a new river embankment to Westminster then via the south side of St James's Park to Pimlico, Chelsea, Brompton and, ultimately, to Brentford and West Drayton. and a railway running on a viaduct along the north side of the river to the terminus of the London and Blackwall Railway at Fenchurch Street. Also proposed was a railway also proposed to cross the river on elevated tracks above London Bridge and Southwark Bridge to connect to lines south of the river.
12. The Thames Embankment Central Terminus. A terminus at Charing Cross for use of multiple railway companies.
13. The London Railway. A scheme to connect many of the existing and proposed railways with a series of connecting lines. Running from Blackfriars Road, west across Waterloo Bridge to Bow Street then north-west to Tottenham Court Road then west through Fitzrovia and Marylebone to Paddington station. A branch would continue north from Tottenham Court Road to New Road then join the London and Birmingham Railway at Euston and the proposed London and York Railway at King's Cross, then along City Road to the Eastern Counties Railway at Shoreditch. From Shoreditch it would run south, cross the river on Southwark Bridge and turn west back to its start at Blackfriars Road. Connections would also be made to the London and Blackwall Railway at Fenchurch Street, the London and Greenwich Railway at London Bridge station and the proposed extension of the London and South Western Railway at Waterloo.
14. The London Connecting Railway and Railway Transit Line. A scheme to surround the metropolitan area with railways running from Barking Reach and Deptford to Shepherd's Bush and with railways running along the north and south banks of the river from the eastern points to Chelsea.
15. The National Junction Railway and City of London Terminus Company. An incomplete proposal for a central terminus in Farringdon with a railway from Southwark to Paddington via Kings Cross, Camden Town and a loop around the north and west of the capital.

South Side of the River Thames

1. The North Kent Railway. A line from north Kent running on a viaduct from New Cross with a terminus at Union Street, Southwark with connections to the London and Croydon Railway at New Cross and London and Greenwich Railway to the east. Proposals also considered a connection to the London and South Western Railway's extension from Waterloo to London Bridge (see below). Also proposed was a continuation line across Southwark Bridge to Bucklesbury near the Bank of England.
2. The South Eastern Railway extension from the London and Greenwich Railway north of New Cross to Waterloo Bridge.
3. The London and South Western Railway extension from York Road to London Bridge. The railway already had permission to build an extension to extend its line from its terminus at Nine Elms to a new terminus at Waterloo. The extension would continue the line on viaduct to the river side near London Bridge.
4. The West End and Southern Counties Railway. A line running from Deptford through Peckham, Camberwell and Kennington then across Waterloo Bridge to a terminus at Wellington Place on the north side of the river.

== Report ==
The commission interviewed representatives of the various railway companies and other proponents of schemes and collected and collated a body of information.

The commission's report was presented to the House of Lords on 29 June 1846 and published in The Times newspaper on 1 July 1846. It was supported by the Minutes of Evidence containing the interviews and information collected.

The commission made five recommendations:

1. None of the lines north of the River Thames should be permitted to enter the area specified for evaluation.
2. Any decision to allow railways within the area specified should be through a coordinated plan approved by parliament and not by applications from individual railway promoters.
3. Either the North Kent Railway should be permitted to construct its line to Union Street and to connect to the London and South Western Railway at Waterloo or the South Eastern Railway should be permitted to extend to Waterloo, but not at ground level as proposed.
4. The London and South Western Railway extension to London Bridge should be permitted.
5. That connections between the railways north and south of the river should be made by a railway encircling the city but remaining outside of the specified area.

== Afterwards ==
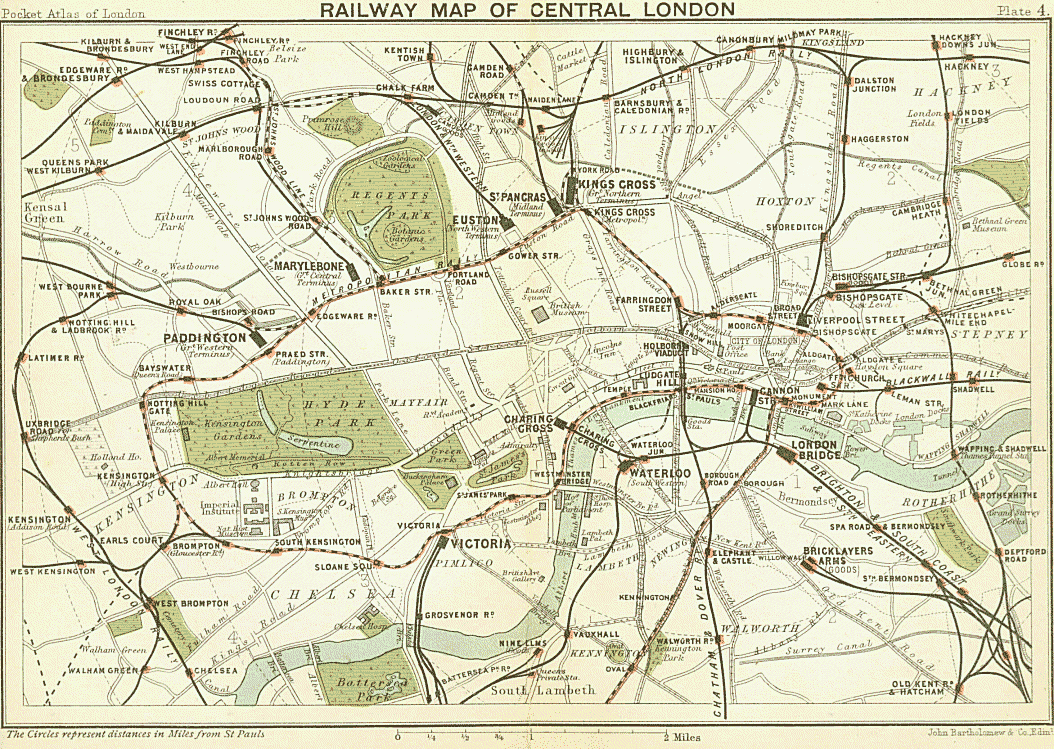
1899 map of railways around the central area

None of the schemes north of the river proceeded and the subsequent locations of King's Cross (opened 1852), St Pancras (1868) and Marylebone (1899) stations were on the north side of the New Road. The schemes south of the river did not proceed directly in the form proposed to the commission.

Entries by main line railways into the commission's review area were permitted during the 1860s:

- The South Eastern Railway was permitted to extend its line from London Bridge to a terminus at Charing Cross close to the location proposed for the Thames Embankment Central Terminus. This opened in 1864 and the London and South Western Railway connected to the line via a link from its station at Waterloo.
- Near Finsbury Circus, in the north-east corner of the commission's area, Broad Street station was opened by the North London Railway in 1865 and Liverpool Street station was opened by the Great Eastern Railway in 1874.
- The London, Chatham and Dover Railway was allowed to open a line to the south side of Blackfriars Bridge and across the river to Ludgate Hill in 1864 and made a northwards connection to the Metropolitan Railway in 1866.
- The South Eastern Railway was permitted to cross the river to a new terminus at Cannon Street in 1866.

Outside the central area various railway companies made connections to each other, informally delivering the commission's recommendation for an encircling railway. The North London Railway (opened 1850) and North and South Western Junction Railway (1853), the West London Railway (1844) and West London Extension Railway (1863), the East London Railway (1869 to 1876) and lines constructed by the London, Brighton and South Coast Railway and the London, Chatham and Dover Railway (1863 to 1866), provided connections between routes. Though mainly used for goods services, some semi-circuitous passenger services were run as the Outer Circle.

The lack of railways into the central area continued to be a problem for travellers and was one of the factors that encouraged proposals for an underground railway connecting the stations on the perimeter of the exclusion zone. The Metropolitan Railway was promoted by Charles Pearson and the first section opened between Farringdon and Paddington in 1863. The line progressively extended from both ends forming connections with the Metropolitan District Railway to complete the Inner Circle in 1876. Both companies extended branches from their central sections into the outlying districts to bring commuters into the capital.

The success of the two underground railway companies led to numerous proposals for other underground lines. The first of these, the deeply tunnelled City and South London Railway, opened in 1890 and was followed by a series of similar lines. In the next two decades, the Waterloo and City Railway (1898), the Central London Railway (1900), the Great Northern and City Railway (1904), the Baker Street and Waterloo Railway (1906), the Great Northern, Piccadilly and Brompton Railway (1906) and the Charing Cross, Euston and Hampstead Railway (1907) all opened beneath the central area forming the nucleus of the London Underground.

== See also ==
- Royal Commission on London Traffic

== References and bibliography ==
=== Bibliography ===
- Brown, Joe (2015) [2006]. London Railway Atlas (4th ed.). Ian Allan. ISBN 978-0-7110-3819-6.
- Croome, Desmond F. (2003). The Circle Line: An Illustrated History. Capital Transport. ISBN 978-1-85414-267-2.
- Horne, Mike (2006). The District Line. Capital Transport. ISBN 1-85414-292-5.
- Rose, Douglas (2016) [1980]. The London Underground, A Diagrammatic History (9th ed.). Douglas Rose/Capital Transport. ISBN 978-1-85414-404-1.
- Watson, W. (1846). Minutes of Evidence taken before The Commissioners Appointed to Investigate the Various Projects for Establishing Railway Termini Within or in the Immediate Vicinity of the Metropolis. Her Majesty's Stationery Office.
- Wolmar, Christian (2005) [2004]. The Subterranean Railway: How the London Underground Was Built and How It Changed the City Forever. Atlantic Books. ISBN 1-84354-023-1.
