= Trams in London =

London tramway network (before 1952) (source).

There have been two separate generations of trams in London, from 1860 to 1952 and from 2000 to the present. There were no trams at all in London between 1952 and 2000.

== History ==
=== Horse trams ===
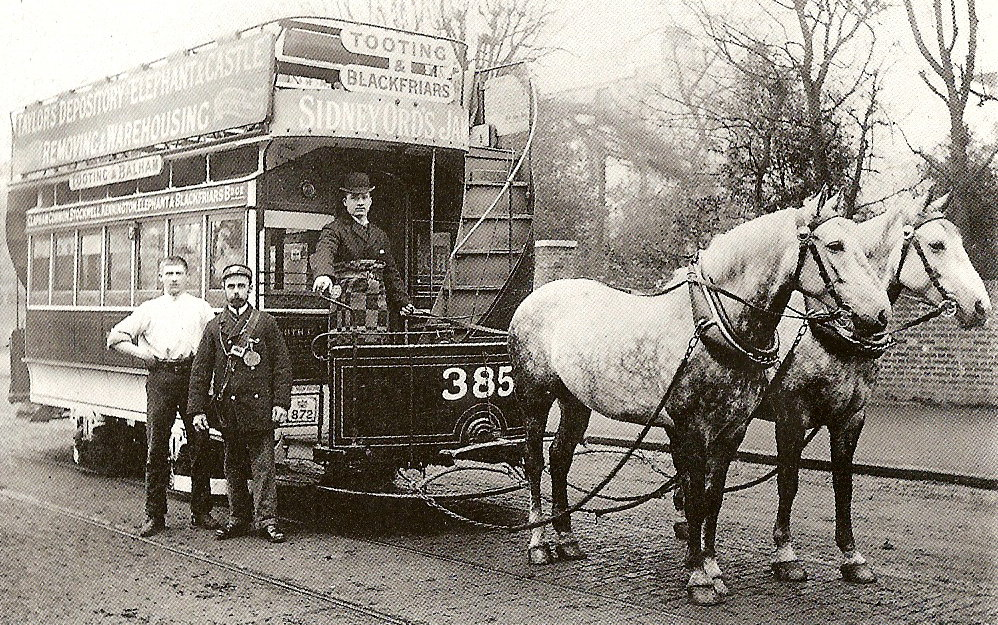
A London Tramways horse tram, c 1890

The first generation of trams in London started in March 1861 when a horse tramway began operating between Marble Arch and Notting Hill Gate. This was followed a month later by a route along Victoria Street in Westminster. These first lines were operated by an American entrepreneur, George Francis Train. Initially, there was strong opposition as, although it was popular with its passengers, the first designs had rails that stood proud of the road surface and created an obstruction for other traffic. This came to a head in 1861 when Train was arrested for "breaking and injuring" the Uxbridge Road and his plans were put on hold.

Eventually Parliament passed legislation permitting tram services, on the condition that the rails were recessed into the carriageway and that the tramways were shared with other road users. Costs of maintenance of the tramway and its immediate neighbouring road carriageway would be borne by the tram companies, thus benefiting the ratepayers, who had been bearing the full cost of highway repairs since the abolition of turnpikes. Fares were set at 1d (1 penny) per mile, with half-price early and late workmen's services. After a demonstration line was built at the Crystal Palace, the first lines authorised by the Act of Parliament in 1870 ran from:

- Blackheath to Vauxhall via Peckham and Camberwell
- Brixton joining the Camberwell line at Kennington
- Whitechapel to Bow
- Kensington to Oxford Street

The new tram companies all adopted the same standard gauge, with the intention of being able to link up services at later dates. Horse tram lines soon opened all over London, typically using two horses to pull a 60-person car. They proved popular as they were cheaper, smoother, roomier and safer than the competing Omnibus or Hackney carriages. Replacement by electric vehicles commenced in 1901; the last horse-drawn trams were withdrawn in 1915.

=== Powered trams ===
There were several early attempts to run motor-powered trams on the London tramlines: John Grantham first trialled an experimental 23-foot (7.0 m) steam tramcar in London in 1873 but withdrew it after it performed poorly. From 1885, the North London Tramways Company operated 25 Merryweather and Dick, Kerr steam engines hauling long-wheelbase Falcon Engine & Car Works trailers, until its liquidation in 1891. Although several towns and cities adopted steam trams, the problems associated with track weight, acceleration, noise and power held back their general acceptance in London.

Between 1881 and 1883, a small number of trams powered by compressed air were trialled on the Caledonian Road tramway.

In 1884, a cable tram was introduced for Highgate Hill, the first cable tramway in Europe, which was followed by a second cable line to draw trams up Brixton Hill to Streatham. Both these systems were replaced within 15 years by electric trams.

The electric tram took some decades to establish itself in London. After the storage battery was invented, an electric tram was tested on the West Metropolitan Tramways line between Acton and Kew in 1883 but it was not until 1901 that Croydon Corporation introduced the first fully operational electric tram services in the Greater London area, using power delivered from overhead wires. Meanwhile, Imperial Tramways, under the directorship of James Clifton Robinson, had acquired the worn-out tram network in West London, which it renovated and extended from Shepherds Bush to Acton, Ealing, Chiswick and Uxbridge, as the London United Tramways Company, using overhead electrification throughout and its own network of ornate power stations, starting with Chiswick.

=== Underground trams ===
There were plans to run an underground tram line between South Kensington and the Albert Hall but it was withdrawn in 1891 and a pedestrian only route, the South Kensington subway, was built instead. The Kingsway tramway subway did go ahead - this started in 1902 going from Theobalds Road to the Victoria Embankment. In the 1930s, the arched tunnels were removed to accommodate double decker trams. The last tram using the subway system ran on the night of 5/6 April 1952.

=== First electric trams ===
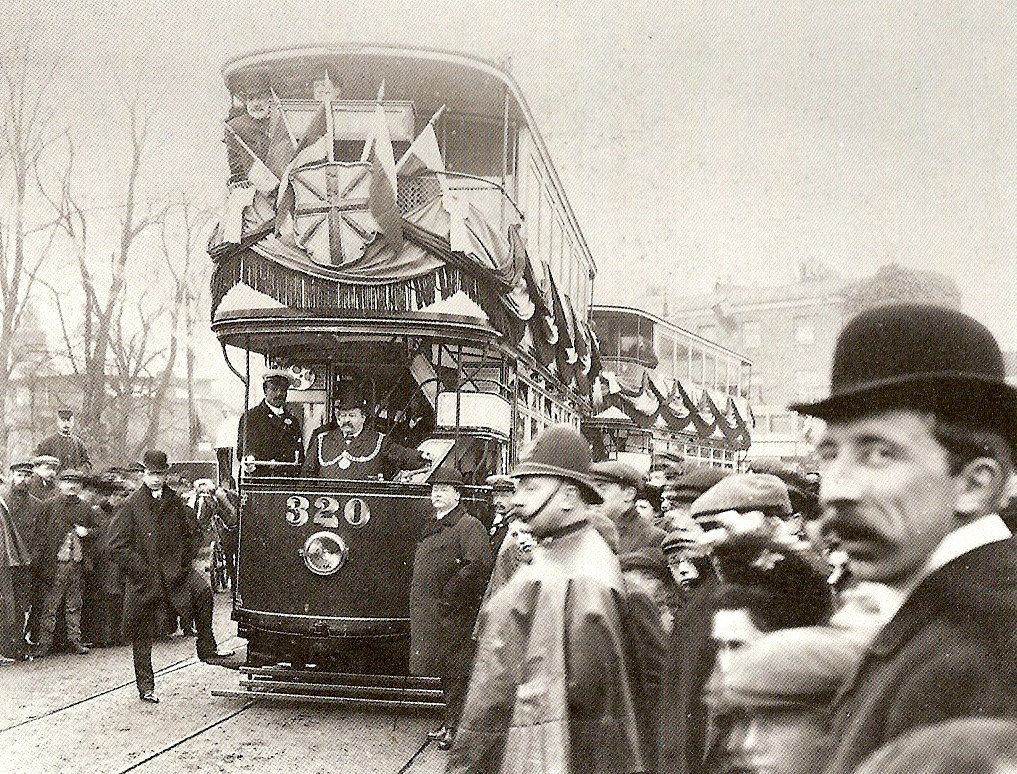
The first electric tram on Kingston Bridge, 1906

After the slow start, electric trams rapidly became very popular; by 1903, there were 300 electric tramcars in London, which carried 800,000 passengers over Whitsun weekend in 1903. The London County Council Tramways first electric line opened in May 1903 between Westminster Bridge and Tooting and the LCC sold 3.3 million tickets in its third year of business, five times the traffic carried by its horse trams. The LCC saw the electric trams as a way of driving social change, as its cheap, fast service could encourage workers to move out of the crowded inner city and live healthier lives in the suburbs. Soon other London boroughs introduced their own electric services, including West Ham, Leyton, Dartford and Bexley. Although the City of London and the West End of London never gave permission for tram lines to be built, trams were allowed to use the Victoria Embankment and cross the Thames over Westminster and Blackfriars Bridges; on 14 September 1909, Lord Mayor George Wyatt Truscott opened the widened Blackfriars Bridge and drove the first tram across it.

By 1914, the London tram operators formed the largest tram network in Europe but the onset of World War I saw a halt in the expansion of the trams and thousands of conductors left to join the armed forces to be replaced by "substitute" women conductors known as 'conductorettes' (A tram driver, like an omnibus driver, was deemed as a reserved occupation as it was considered that women did not have the physical capability of operating the heavy electrical controller or the brakes. Also, the tram driver was in an exposed position as the trams did not have windscreens, because the Metropolitan Police considered them dangerous).

Several different companies and municipalities operated London's electric tramways. The largest was the LCC, with lines equipped with conduit current collection. Other operators mainly used the more conventional overhead electric wires. Many of London's trams had to be equipped with both systems of electricity supply, with routes being equipped with change points. The overhead wires were made of copper, which weighed half a pound a foot.

During their heyday, tram services covered much of inner London and reached out to the suburbs, assisted by facilities like the Kingsway tramway subway, which enabled the longest tram route entirely within the County of London to operate: a weekend service between Archway, then part of Highgate, and Downham via Brockley, 16 miles (26 kilometres).

Route coverage might have been wider still but the terms of the 1870 Act meant that the passage of new tramways had to be negotiated individually with local authorities, who would sometimes impose prohibitively expensive improvement works as a condition of approval. Passengers had to make a hazardous journey into the middle of the street before they could board a tram.

After the War, money for investment and maintenance became harder to find, as passengers migrated to the new motor bus services. In the 1930s, The London United and Metropolitan Electric companies purchased a large fleet of modern double-deck Feltham trams, built by the Union Construction Company at Feltham. LUT accompanied this change by introducing electric trolleybuses using twin overhead wires as a cheaper alternative for 17 miles (27 kilometres) of its routes in 1931.

A Royal Commission on Transport, held between 1928 and 1931, ensured that the tram companies retained complete responsibility for the maintenance of its rails and highway, which was shared with other road users who contributed its wear. But this was accompanied by Parliamentary bills in 1930 and 1933 that set up the London Passenger Transport Board to operate the LCC's existing bus and London Underground service and to purchase and manage all of London's tramways. Under the LPTB, there was no new investment in tram services and the maintenance of services became a hot political issue in elections in South London, an area poorly served by Underground trains. The merged tram services were held back from introducing new, quieter and more comfortable track and vehicles, in favour of trolleybus services and tubes provided under the New Works Programme. Although the trams returned gross annual revenues of £850,000 (equivalent to £48,036,461 in 2025),, the net surplus was £128,000 (equivalent to £7,233,726 in 2025), after costs were taken by the LCC, partly to repay the debt of £18m resulting from the merger.

=== Abandonment ===
At this time, trams were starting to be considered out-dated and inflexible and the phasing-out and replacement by diesel buses or trolleybuses started in earnest around 1935, when a large proportion of the trams and of the tracks and ancillary equipment were nearing the end of their useful life. Replacement continued until hostilities stopped the conversion programme in June 1940, leaving only the South London trams and the routes that went through the Kingsway subway into North London. After World War II, shortages of steel and electrical machinery were cited as reasons for not investing in maintenance, while the LCC reported that the service ran at a loss. On 15 November 1946 the London Passenger Transport Board announced that the remaining trams in London would be replaced by diesel buses, stated as being "eminently flexible and much cheaper". (London Transport Tramways Handbook, Willoughby and Oakley 1972). The market for trams became smaller as other tramways were being forced to close at that time, as the 1948 nationalisation of electricity suppliers removed access to cheap electricity for those undertakings which owned their local power company.

Alexander Valentine, one of the five full-time members of the London Transport Executive, saw trams as a major cause of road congestion, which would be relieved by the introduction of buses, with the aesthetic benefit of doing away with overhead wires and their noisy operation. A report in The Economist in 1952 suggested a more comprehensive list of reasons for their demise, including:

- the 1870 Tramways Act, which placed a great financial burden on the operator for road maintenance even though it was not responsible for all the wear;
- London had streets that were too narrow, unlike continental cities;
- London's housing developments were too far away from tram routes;
- authorities were prejudiced against trams (Lord Ashfield, chairman of the LPTB, was a constant opponent of trams).

The capital cost of replacing and updating the worn-out infrastructure and trams was also seen as prohibitive when compared with the £9 m capital cost of buying buses with a slightly smaller carrying capacity.

"Operation Tramaway", the replacement of the tram service by diesel buses, was announced in July 1950 by Lord Latham of the London Transport Executive. Retirement started in October 1950 and London's final first-generation trams ran in the early hours of 6 July 1952 to a rousing reception at New Cross Depot.

No general improvement in traffic flow was seen after the trams were withdrawn.

During the closure cycle of London's tram system, almost 100 of the most modern trams known as the "Feltham" class and dating from 1931 were withdrawn and sold to Leeds where they continued in service until the abandonment of that city's trams in 1959. Some London tramcars have been preserved on static display at London's Transport Museum (in Covent Garden) and in working order at the National Tramway Museum at Crich, Derbyshire. A working London tram can also be seen and ridden on at the East Anglia Transport Museum in Carlton Colville near Lowestoft, Suffolk.

== Current trams ==
The current generation of trams started with the opening of Tramlink in 2000. Croydon previously had many tramlines. The first to close was Addiscombe – East Croydon Station route through George Street to Cherry Orchard Road in 1927 and the last Purley - Embankment and Croydon (Coombe Road) - Thornton Heath routes closed in April 1951. However, in spring 1950, the Highways Committee was presented by the Mayor with the concept of running trams between East Croydon station and the new estate being constructed at New Addington. This was based on the fact that the Feltham cars used in Croydon were going to Leeds to serve their new estates on reserved tracks. In 1962 a private study, with assistance from BR engineers, showed how easy it was to convert the West Croydon - Wimbledon train service to tram operation and successfully prevent conflict between trams and trains. These two concepts became joined in joint LRTL/TLRS concept of New Addington to Wimbledon every 15 mins via East and West Croydon and Mitcham plus New Addington to Tattenham Corner every 15 mins via East and West Croydon, Sutton and Epsom Downs. A branch into Forestdale to give an overlap service from Sutton was also included. During the 1970s, several BR directors and up-and-coming managers were aware of the advantages. In fact, Peter Parker was very well aware of this even before becoming chairman. Chris Green, upon becoming managing director, Network South East, published his plans in 1987 expanding the concept to take in the Tattenham Corner and Caterham branches and provide a service from Croydon to Lewisham via Addiscombe and Hayes. Working with Tony Ridley, then managing director, London Transport, the scheme was brought out into the open, and Scott Mackintosh was appointed Light Rail Manager in 1989.

The scheme was accepted in principle in February 1990 by Croydon Council, which worked with what was then London Regional Transport (LRT) to propose Tramlink to Parliament, resulting in the Croydon Tramlink Act 1994 giving LRT the legal power to build and run Tramlink. The new Act still incorporated major parts of the 1870 Tramways Act which had held back previous private tram companies. However, as most of the routes affected were managed by the same authority, the obligation to maintain the road surface was not a new cost.

Tramlink operates with modern articulated tramcars of Bombardier low-floor design called CR4000, based upon the K4000 type of the Cologne Stadtbahn, with the tram units numbered from 2530. This number was the next in sequence from the last London tram, number 2529, withdrawn in 1952. Since it opened on 11 May 2000, the 38 km of track have been operated by FirstGroup on behalf of Transport for London on three routes across South London. It features accessible low platforms that match the 350 mm high car floor or tram stops at the same height as the pavement. Much of the track is dedicated tramway, with some sections shared with other road vehicles, including some of the same roads served by the previous generation of trams. The off-street track includes new rights-of-way, adapted former railway lines and one section running alongside a Network Rail line. Part of the formation between Mitcham and Hackbridge was originally used by the Surrey Iron Railway, the world's first public railway, authorised by Act of Parliament in 1803.

== Future ==
New tram systems and extensions to existing tram lines have been discussed or planned:

- Tramlink extensions linking the Croydon-Beckenham route from Harrington Road up Anerley Hill to Crystal Palace, using an existing rail right of way. Previous schemes have considered extensions to Purley, Streatham and Tooting Also, Beckenham extension to Lewisham had been previously mooted.
- West London Tram from Shepherd's Bush to Uxbridge. This scheme was "put on hold" after the approval of Crossrail

Two more tram systems were planned but their development has been abandoned:

- Cross River Tram linking Kings Cross and Camden to Peckham and Brixton
- In the lead-up to the 2008 mayoral election, Ken Livingstone proposed an Oxford Street Tram that would run along Oxford Street from Marble Arch to Tottenham Court Road. It would have been tied into plans to pedestrianise Oxford Street and Marble Arch, funded through property development. Construction would have begun in 2012 with completion in 2018

=== Sutton Link Extension ===
- The Sutton Link is a proposed tram line in South London, aiming to connect Colliers Wood to Sutton via St Helier. Initially proposed in the early 2000s, public consultations on the route were held in the late 2010s. A preferred route was announced in February 2020. However, financial constraints caused by the COVID-19 pandemic led Transport for London to suspend the project in July 2020. Despite being included in the London Plan, the project faced further delays in 2023 due to a "weak business case" and a lack of funding.
