= Leyton Urban District Council Tramways =

Passenger tramway service in Leyton, England

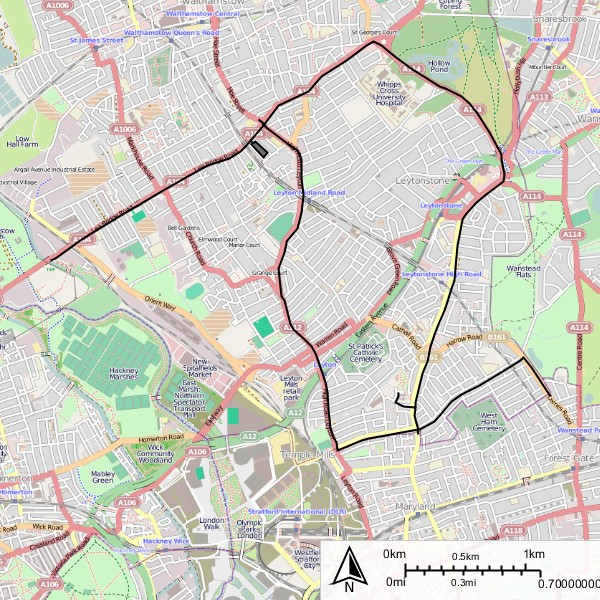
- Map of the routes of the Leyton Urban District Council Tramways

Operation
- Locale: Leyton
- Open: 1 June 1905
- Close: 1 July 1933
- Status: Closed

Infrastructure
- Track gauge: 1,435 mm (4 ft 8 1/2 in)
- Propulsion system: Electric

Statistics
- Route length: 9.52 miles (15.32 km)

Leyton Urban District Council Tramways operated a passenger tramway service in Leyton between 1905 and 1933.

== History ==
Leyton Council Tramway services started on 1 June 1905 when the council took over ownership of the Lea Bridge, Leyton and Walthamstow Tramways Company lines which were within the boundary of the council. On 1 June 1906 they also took over the North Metropolitan Tramways services within the boundary of the council.

In June 1921 an arrangement was reached with the London County Council Tramways that they would work and manage the urban district council's transport undertaking. Leyton council retained responsibility for overhead equipment and the trams continued to bear the council's insignia. In 1926 Leyton was incorporated as a municipal borough leading to a renaming as Leyton Corporation Tramways, and the borough's coat of arms was applied to the tramcars.

The depot was located off Lea Bridge Road at TQ 3773 8798.

== Closure ==
The services were taken over by London Passenger Transport Board on 1 July 1933.
