= Cross River Tram =

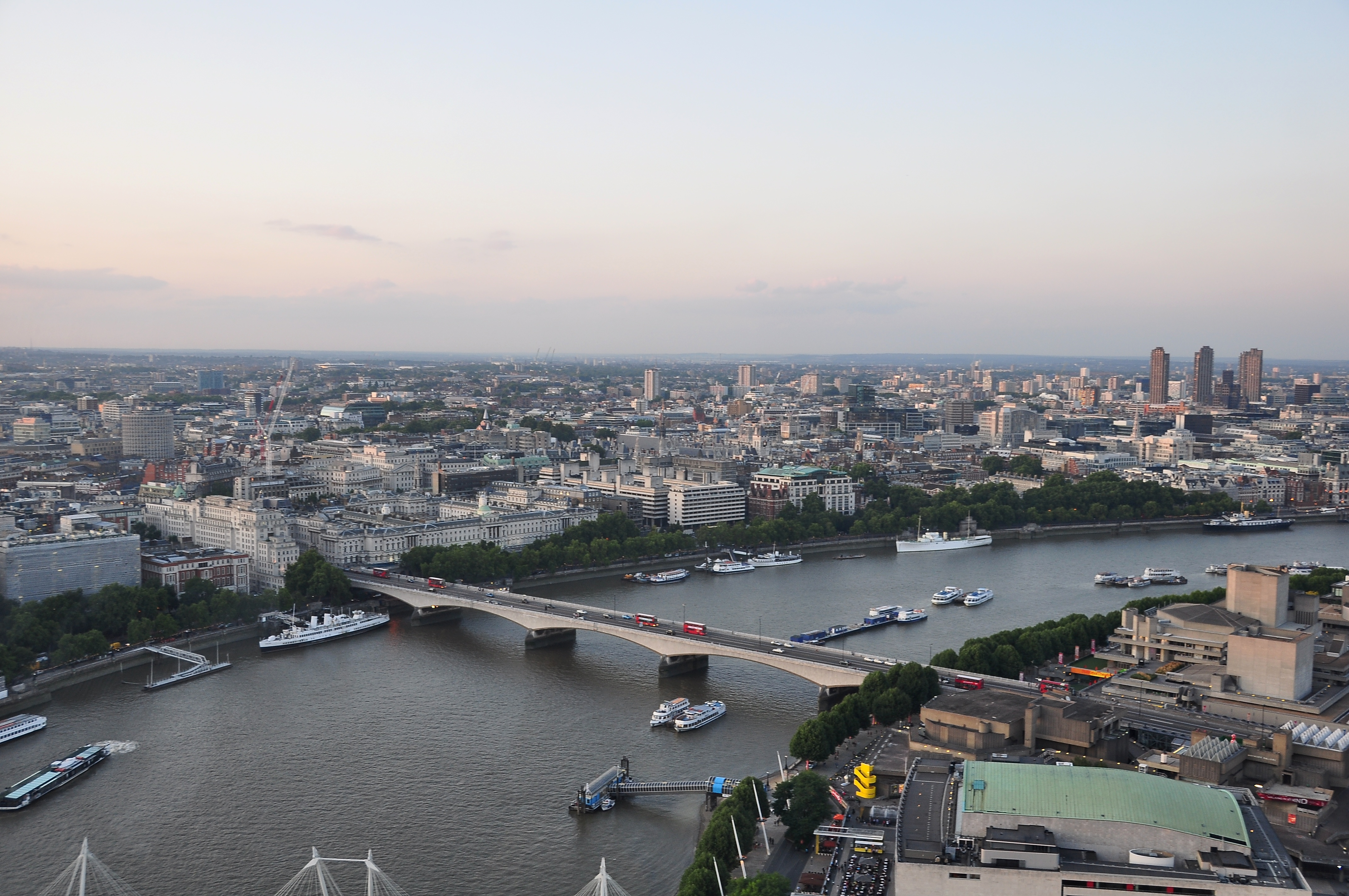
- Waterloo Bridge, the planned crossing point for the tram over the River Thames

Overview
- Owner: Transport for London
- Locale: Camden, Southwark & Lambeth, London, England
- Transit type: Tram

Operation
- Operation will start: Abandoned proposal

Technical
- System length: 10 mi (16 km)
- Track gauge: Standard gauge

Cross River Tram (formerly Cross River Transit) was a Transport for London (TfL) proposal for a 10-mile (16 km) tram system in London. It was planned to run on a north–south route from Camden Town in the north, via King's Cross, to Peckham and Brixton in the south.

The Cross River Tram scheme was proposed to relieve overcrowding on the London Underground and was due to begin operation by 2016. The project was cancelled by then mayor of London Boris Johnson in 2008 due to funding problems. A 2016 review of the CRT plan by subsequent mayor Sadiq Khan concluded that the CRT project would not be reopened at that time.

== Overview ==
The tram was planned to relieve overcrowding on the London Underground, and to improve transport in areas currently without good public transport, such as the Aylesbury Estate in Southwark, to support regeneration.

Trams would have run up to every 4 minutes on each branch, giving a 2-minute service through central London at peak times.

Despite following the same route, it was not envisaged that the Cross River Tram line would use the former Kingsway tramway subway.

== Cancellation ==
On 18 July 2007, Mayor of London Ken Livingstone told the London Assembly that he had asked TfL to consider splitting the implementation by building the southern section in advance of the northern section; it was not, however, clear where such a split would be. In May 2008, Livingstone's successor as mayor, Boris Johnson, announced that he intended to review the project in light of the lack of central government funding for the planned route.

On 6 November 2008, Transport for London announced that the Cross River Tram would not be built. In a statement, it said: "Given the lack of funding available to implement the project and the likelihood of not securing additional third party funding, TfL is not in a position to develop the scheme any further." The £1.3bn project was cancelled in 2008 as part of a move to save £2.4bn of transport-related funds. Announcements from TfL in 2009 stated that the project was "on hold", and that TfL would explore alternative schemes, including increased capacity on Underground lines.

In June 2016, Caroline Russell, a Green Party member of the London Assembly, asked new mayor of London Sadiq Khan to review the business case for a tram service via Waterloo Bridge and Elephant & Castle. Khan subsequently stated that he had no plans to revive the cancelled tram scheme, and expressed the view that improved Tube services and the extension of the London Overground through south London suburbs, along with the proposed reopening of Camberwell railway station, would meet the transport needs along the corridor that would have been served by the Cross River Tram.

== Proposed route ==
In late 2006 and early 2007 TfL consulted residents on their views of the following route options:

- Camden Town to Waterloo

Camden Town – Mornington Crescent – Euston station – Tavistock Square – Russell Square – Holborn – Aldwych – South Bank – Waterloo

- Waterloo to Brixton

Waterloo – (either Lambeth North/Imperial War Museum/Kennington Cross or Elephant & Castle) – Oval – (either Stockwell or Brixton Road) – Brixton (either Pope's Road or Brixton St Matthew's Church)

- Waterloo to Peckham

Waterloo – St George's Circus – Elephant & Castle – Heygate Street – Thurlow Street – (either Burgess Park/Chandler Way or Wells Way/Southampton Way) – Peckham

- Euston to King's Cross

Euston – (either Crowndale Road or Somers Town) – King's Cross

On 11 September 2007, TfL published the results of their 2007 consultation:

- Euston to King's Cross – the majority of respondents preferred the route via Somers Town, except Somers Town's residents who preferred the Crowndale Road route
- Euston to Camden Town – the majority of respondents preferred the route via Camden High Street
- Waterloo to Oval – the majority of respondents preferred the route via Elephant & Castle
- Oval to Brixton – most respondents preferred the route via Brixton Road
- In Brixton town centre – the majority of respondents preferred the route via Effra Road
- Waterloo to Peckham – the majority of respondents preferred the route via Burgess Park
- In Peckham town centre – the majority of respondents preferred the route via Jocelyn Street and north of Peckham Library and Cerise Road as the terminus
