= Theobalds Road =

Road in Holborn, Central London

Coordinates: 51.52055°N 0.11704°W

- Tibbalds Road
- Interactive map of Theobalds Road
- Former name: King's Way
- Namesake: Theobalds Palace
- Type: Road
- Area: Holborn
- Location: London Borough of Camden
- Postal code: WC

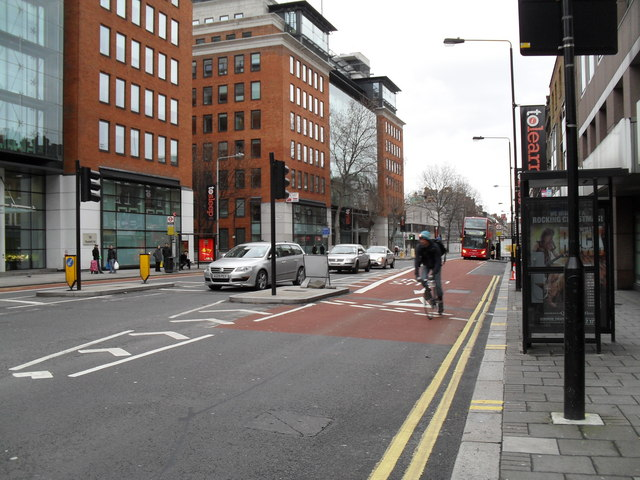
Theobalds Road

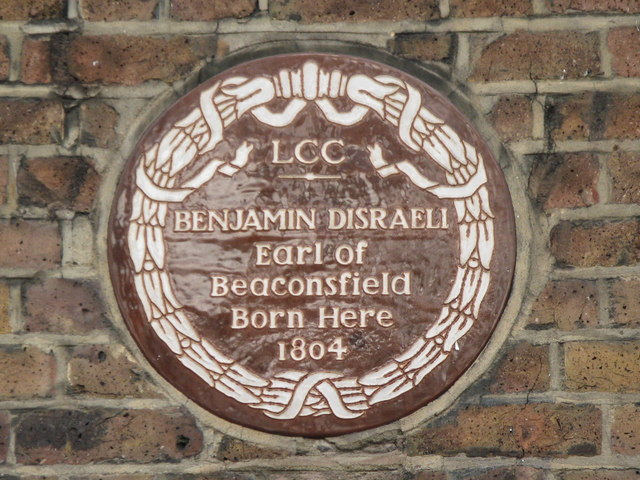
Benjamin Disraeli's birthplace on Theobalds Road is commemorated with a brown plaque

Theobalds Road is a road in the Holborn district of London. It is named after Theobalds Palace because King James I used this route when going between there and London, travelling with his court and baggage of some 200 carts. For this reason, it was also known as the King's Way which is now the name of the nearby road, Kingsway.

A tram tunnel was built under Kingsway in 1902–1906 which had its north-eastern entrance at Theobalds Road. When the tram network was closed in the 1950s, the Theobalds Road end was used as a flood control centre and movie location. In 1925 the South Place Ethical Society purchased land on Theobalds Road where the rear entrance to Conway Hall was subsequently constructed.

The road's name is usually pronounced intuitively (/ˈθiːəbəldz/), but traditionally it was pronounced "Tibbalds" (/ˈtɪbəldz/).

The road was home to the Theobald's Road Institute (or Institution) at number 8, founded by William Benbow, in 1820.

== Notable residents ==
- Samuel Coleridge-Taylor was born at number 15.
- Benjamin Disraeli was born at number 22.
