= Strand underpass =

Vehicle tunnel in central London

Coordinates: 51°30′59.7″N 0°07′07.9″W

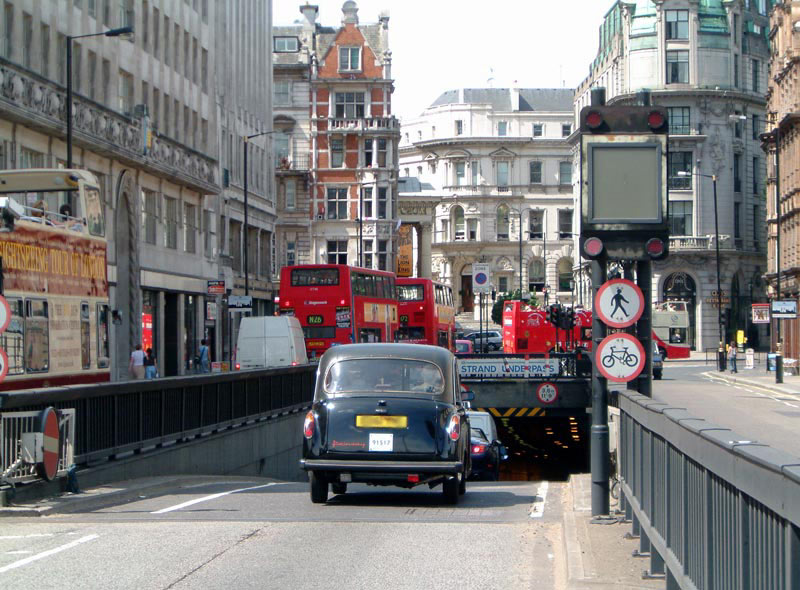
Entrance to the underpass from Waterloo Bridge

The Strand underpass is a one-way road tunnel in central London connecting Waterloo Bridge to Kingsway near Holborn. Opened in 1964, it was built within the former Kingsway tramway subway, which closed in the 1950s. It used to be open to cyclists, but they are now banned. Since 2017 pedestrians have been prohibited from the carriageway of Waterloo Bridge, so there are no longer signs prohibiting them at the entrance to the underpass.

== History ==
The underpass is built within part of the former Kingsway tramway subway, which was 20 feet (6.1 m) wide and allowed bi-directional flow because the trams were relatively narrow and ran on rails. The new underpass was built by John Mowlem & Co as a concrete box within the former tram subway and opened on 21 January 1964. It is only 17 feet (5.2 m) wide and is one-way because of the space vehicles not on rails use going round the tight bend beneath the junction between Aldwych and Kingsway (see the lower image).

Usually it operates northbound, but In 2012 it was made southbound to ease traffic flow during the 2012 Summer Olympics. The headroom is only 12.5 feet (3.8 m) because the tunnel has to pass beneath the bridge abutment while on a 1:12 gradient. The carriageway is at the level of the former tramway. An electronic 'eye' alerts drivers of tall vehicles and diverts them to an 'escape route' to the left of the entrance. However, high vehicles do still try to pass through and so get stuck occasionally.

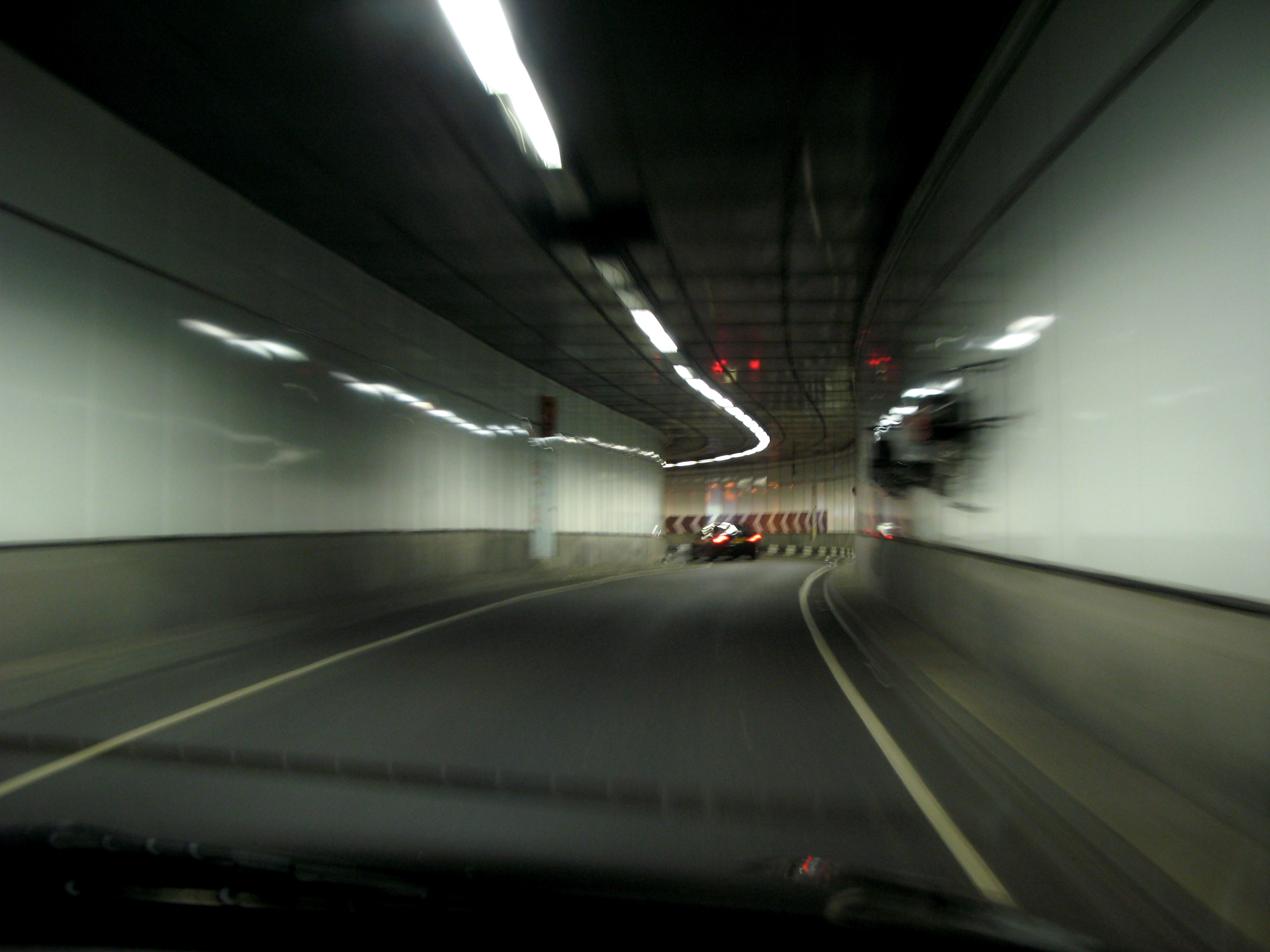
Inside the underpass

At the northern end of the underpass the road rises to the surface on a new carriageway supported by metal pillars. This passes through the site of the former Aldwych tramway station; because of the greater width requirement, 27 trees and some pavement sections were removed for it to be constructed.

The tunnel was used by the 521 bus route northbound until it was withdrawn in April 2023.
