= Kingsway tramway subway =

Former tram tunnel in London

Coordinates: 51°31′06.1″N 0°07′14.8″W

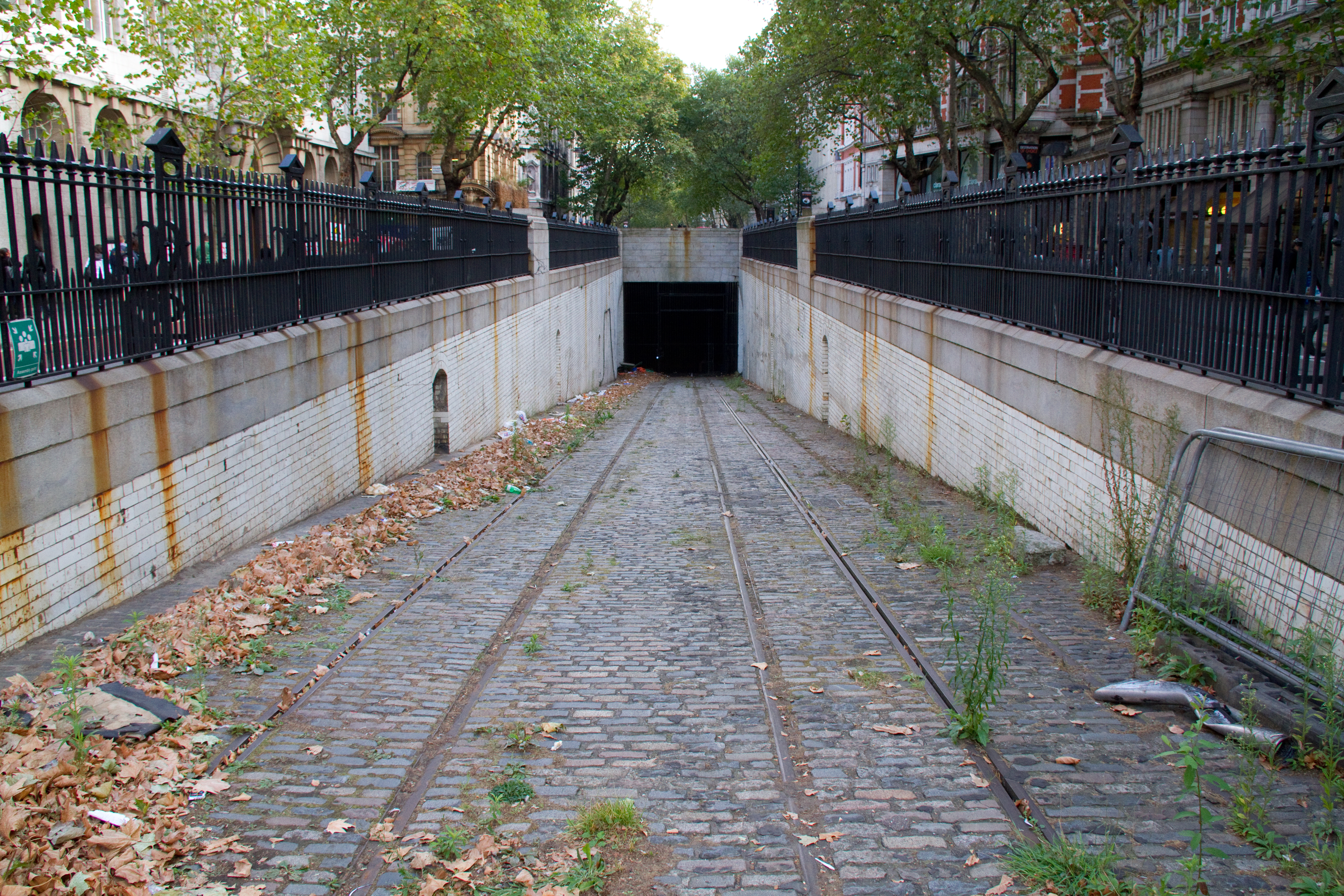
Kingsway Subway northern entrance ramp in Southampton Row

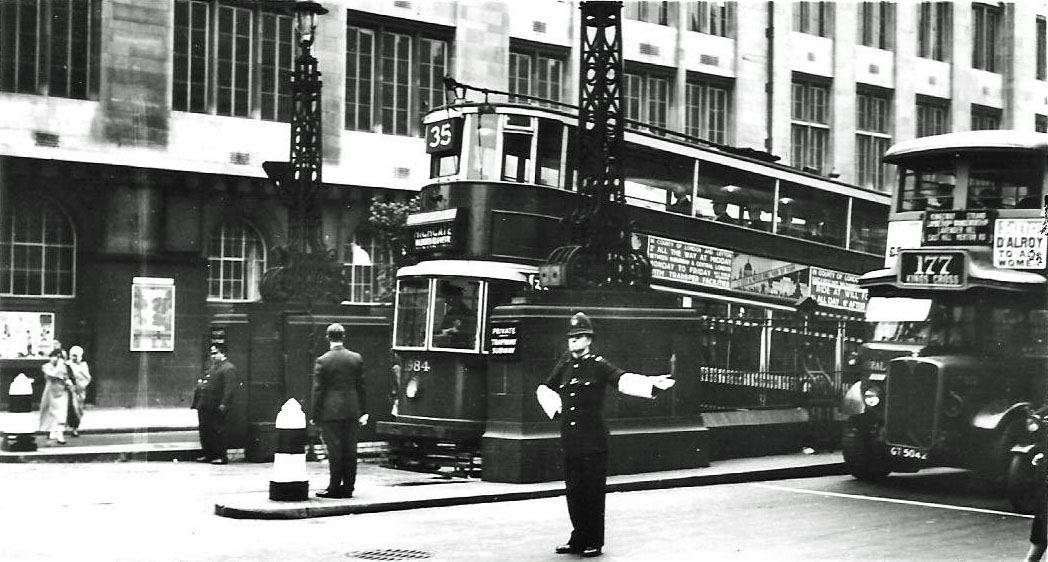
A tram emerging from the northbound tunnel in 1933. Note the policeman on point duty to allow the tram to emerge,

Interactive map of subway route

The Kingsway tramway subway is a cut-and-cover tunnel in central London, built by the London County Council, and the only one of its kind in Britain. The decision in 1898 to clear slum districts in the Holborn area provided an opportunity to use the new streets for a tramway connecting the lines in the north and south. Following the pattern of tramways in New York (the Murray Hill Tunnel) and Boston (the MBTA Green Line), it was decided to build this as an underground connection.

The subway opened in 1906 to Aldwych and to Embankment in 1908. It closed in 1952. Most of the southern end was adapted as a traffic underpass in 1964. The separate northern section was listed at Grade II by Historic England in 1998.

== History ==
=== 1902–1905: Construction ===
Proposals by Royal Commission on London Traffic for Tram Routes in Central London, 1905. Blue = existing routes; red = proposed routes; dashed = sub-surface; double red = proposed Main Avenues

The London County Council had for many years wanted to connect its "North Side" and "South Side" tramway networks. The nearest that the "North Side" tramways got to central London was Theobalds Road, (Note: A tramway on Gray's Inn Road reached Holborn, but there was no possibility of extending it southwards or eastwards because the City of London rejected trams.) while the "South Side" tramways reached but had not been permitted to cross various bridges. In 1898 it promoted a Bill for a tramway over Westminster Bridge, along the Embankment and across Blackfriars Bridge. This was rejected even though the carriageways of the bridges were more than 55' wide (i.e. six lanes).

In 1902, as part of the clearance of the Holborn area and the building of Kingsway and Aldwych, the LCC decided to build a tramway subway beneath the new roads. As well as extending the existing tramway route from Theobalds Road to Aldwych, the LCC planned to continue the subway so that it could send "North Side" trams over Waterloo Bridge to the Central Repair Depot at Charlton in South East London. This was not intended for tramway services: the carriageway of Waterloo Bridge was only 27'6" wide (i.e. three lanes).

Legal problems delayed permission to build the subway and tram route and it was not until 1906 that permission to build was granted. By then the Royal Commission on London Traffic had reported, recommending extensive upgrades to the tramway system and to roads and bridges. It argued that trams needed their own separate space to provide reliable, frequent services. Among its proposals was that the Kingsway subway should connect with a tramway along the Embankment and across Westminster and Blackfriars Bridges. It proposed tramways across many London bridges, but not Waterloo Bridge.

Because of a sewer at the northern end and the District Railway to the south it was decided to build the subway for single-deck trams only. After leaving the subway at the south end, trams turned right along the Embankment to Westminster Bridge or left on a service from Bloomsbury to the Hop Exchange. This latter service was short-lived and the tracks were removed in 1930.

The approach from the north near Southampton Row was a 170-foot (52 m) open cutting with a 1 in 10 (10%) gradient. The tracks passed through cast iron tubes underneath the Fleet sewer before rising slightly to enter Holborn tramway station. South from here the subway was built with a steel roof to Aldwych tramway station and, because it was not initially planned to run a public service south of here, the tracks leading towards the Strand were used as a depot with appropriate equipment and inspection pits.

Tramcar Emerging from Kingsway Subway onto Embankment beside Waterloo Bridge, London, 1910. Note the policeman on point duty stopping eastbound traffic.

In the parliamentary session of 1905, plans were submitted for an additional station at the south end of the tunnel, under Wellington Street. These were overtaken by the recommendations of the Royal Commission on London Traffic with its tramways along the Embankment and across Westminster Bridge. A new sharp curve was built under Wellington Street (now Lancaster Place) to enable an exit through the northern abutment of Waterloo Bridge where the western Waterloo Stairs had been. A triangular junction with the through line on the Embankment was constructed. The eastern side of this junction, leading to Blackfriars, was removed as part of the 1930s upgrade.

=== 1906: Opening ===
Services opened to the public on 24 February 1906 from Angel to Aldwych, with a ceremonial opening by the chairman of the Highways Committee. The first journey took 12 minutes northbound and 10 minutes to return, despite horse-drawn vehicles also using the roads on the surface part of the route. On 16 November that year the routes were extended north from The Angel to Highbury station. As the existing wooden-bodied trams, common on other routes, were not permitted through the subway a new class of trams with steel bodies, known as Type-G, were constructed especially for the service.

Through services commenced on 10 April 1908 from Highbury station to Tower Bridge and to Kennington Gate, with a procession of six cars going south from Holborn through to Kennington, then to Elephant and Castle to return through the subway to Angel. The Kennington service was not commercially viable and services were diverted to operate to Queens Road in Battersea which, due to a low bridge, could be operated with single-deck vehicles only. Drivers of the trams recorded difficulty in climbing the ramp north from Holborn tramway station and would sometimes roll all the way back to the station. Drivers on routes through the subway had to have at least two years' experience on other services to be considered for these routes.

=== 1929: Double-decker trams ===
Service patterns continued to change, especially with the opening of tram lines over Blackfriars Bridge on 14 September 1909, and during the 1920s it was realised that to remain profitable the subway needed to be able to take double-deck trams. In 1929 it was decided to increase the headroom to 16 feet 6 inches (5.03 m). Work started on 11 September of that year, resulting in the replacement of the cast iron tubes by a new steel girder-supported roof and the diversion of the sewer. In places the trackbed was lowered by 5 feet (1.5 m), requiring the underpinning of the walls with concrete. After the last services ran on the night of 2 February 1930 the subway was closed until the formal re-opening on 14 January 1931 using E/3 type tram no. 1931 on new route 31, with public services starting the following day. The two tramway stations were also completely rebuilt. Routes were now Hackney to Wandsworth or Tooting, Leyton to Westminster, Highbury to Waterloo station or Norbury and Archway to Kennington.

A weekend service between Highgate (Archway) and Downham via Brockley ran until 1932. With a distance of 16 miles (26 km), this was the longest tram route entirely within the County of London.

=== 1935–1940: Introduction of trolleybuses ===
The London Passenger Transport Board was formed in 1933, taking over the London County Council trams. It was decided soon after to replace all trams in London by "more modern vehicles". The abandonment programme began in 1935 with trams in South-West, West, North-West, North and East London mostly being replaced by trolleybuses. The replacement programme proceeded swiftly until 1940, when the last of the pre-war series of conversions occurred, leaving only the South London trams and the subway routes 31, 33 and 35, the only North London tram routes to survive the war.

Prototype Kingsway trolleybus no. 1379, with exits on both sides with folding doors, was constructed for feasibility tests through the subway, but these were unsuccessful as trolleybuses would have had to run on battery power through the subway, headroom restrictions making it impossible to use overhead current collection. The vehicle was retained and ran in normal service alongside conventional trolleybuses.

==== Waterloo Bridge rebuilding ====
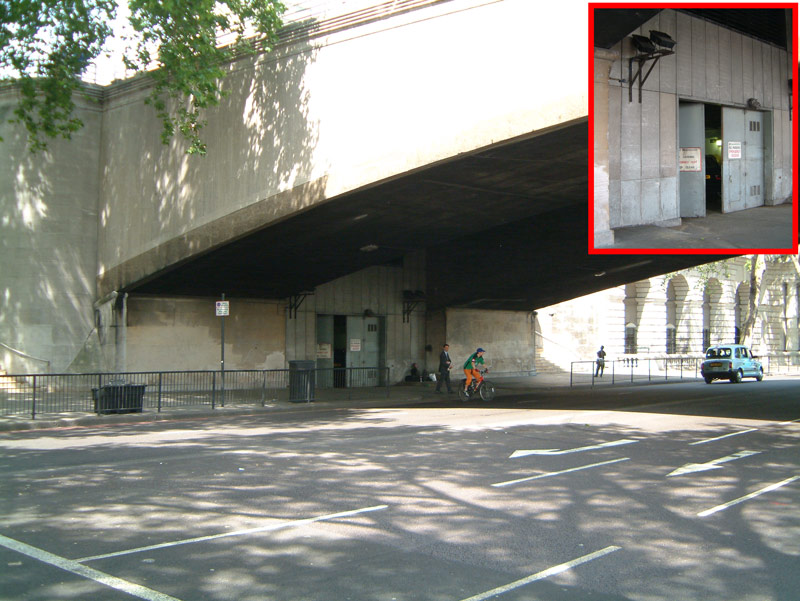
1937 southern portal under Waterloo Bridge

In 1937, the rebuilding of Waterloo Bridge required the diversion of the side entrance to the tramway to a new position centrally underneath the bridge, which opened on 21 November of that year. There were metal doors covering this entrance until 2007, when construction began on the London Buddha Bar, which opened in autumn 2008.

Changes leaflet

=== 1946–1952: Withdrawal of trams ===
In 1946, it was decided to replace London's remaining trams "as soon as possible", this time by diesel buses. The first subway route to be withdrawn was route 31, on 1 October 1950, with the remaining two routes, 33 and 35, being withdrawn after service on Saturday, 5 April 1952, the last public services being "specials" on the Sunday, shortly after midnight. During the early hours of the next morning the remaining trams north of the subway were run through to the depots south of the Thames.

=== 1952–1957: Closure ===
Trams were abandoned in London on 5 July 1952, after which street tracks were lifted, but those in the subway mostly remain in place. In 1953, London Transport used the tramway to store 120 unused buses and coaches in case they were needed for the Coronation but proposals to convert the tramway subway to a car park or a film studio failed and it was leased out as a storage facility from October 1957.

After closure, a number of cartoons appeared in London newspapers based on the closed tramway, with ghostly trams or 'lost' tube trains. On 23 November 1954 an edition of The Goon Show entitled 'The Last Tram' featured a driver and conductress (Henry Crun and Minnie Bannister) who hid in the subway for 2½ years in order to ensure they were London's last tram.

=== 1958 to present: Strand Underpass and other uses ===
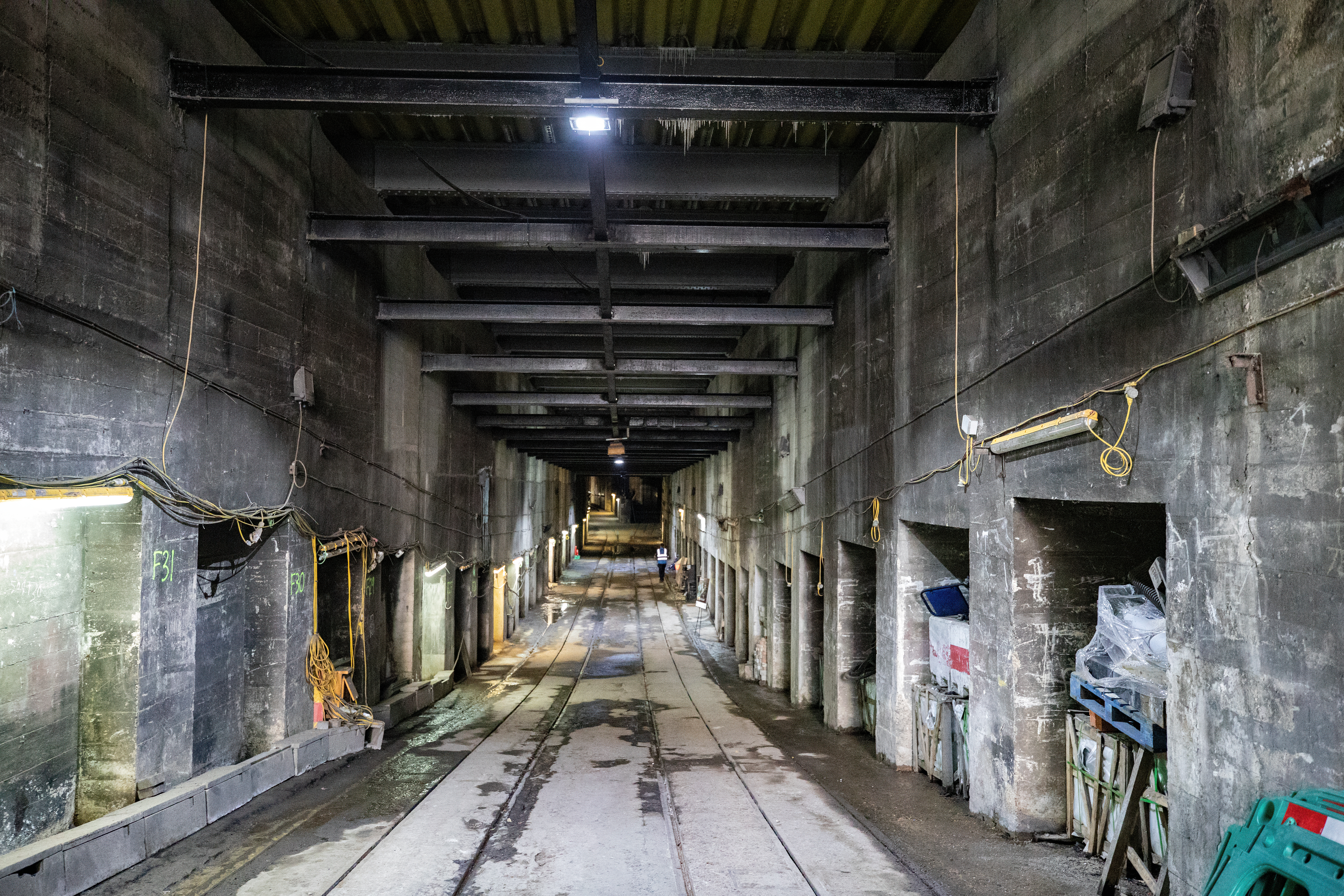
Interior of subway

In June 1958, the London County Council proposed making use of the subway for light traffic from Waterloo Bridge in order to reduce traffic congestion at its junction with Strand and, in April 1962, the go-ahead was given for part of the southern end of the subway to be used. Construction began that September and it opened as the Strand Underpass on 21 January 1964.

In an extensive plan for a light rail network by Timothy Runnacles (1977), it was envisaged that the one line would use the former Kingsway tramway subway.

Between 8 October and 8 November 2009, the tunnel hosted a site-specific art installation called Chord by the artist Conrad Shawcross.

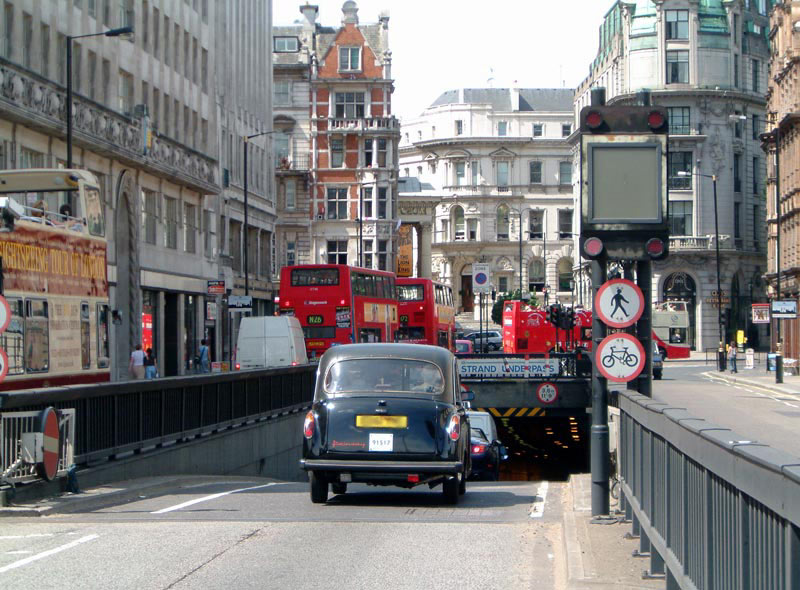
Part of the subway is now a tunnel for cars

Although following the same route along Kingsway, it was not envisaged that the proposed Cross River Tram would use the subway. The Cross River Tram project was cancelled in 2008.

In 2012, it was announced that Crossrail's tunnel contractor BAM Nuttall/Ferrovial/Kier (BFK) would form a grout shaft beneath the original tunnel of the old central London subway. The purpose of the grout shafts was to stabilize the ground in anticipation of the arrival of tunnel boring equipment in 2013. Crossrail agreed to restore the tunnel to its former condition on completion of the tunnel boring project, and a planning application to undertake this restoration was submitted in 2017.

The Greater London Authority publication Human Streets in March 2016 contained the proposal that the tunnel could be reopened for cycling, in order to connect cyclists using the busy Theobalds Road route with the East-West Cycle Superhighway on the Embankment, thereby avoiding four junctions difficult for cyclists.

In July 2021 it was announced that visitors would be able to tour the tunnel, platforms and halls of the Kingsway station, in a programme organised by the London Transport Museum.

The southern section of the abandoned subway between the Embankment and the Strand Underpass was converted into a branch of the Buddha Bar chain of bar/restaurants. This involved the demolition of the pedestrian subways under Waterloo Bridge and extensive construction in the bridge's undercroft. The site is now the Emerald Theatre. The remaining Grade II listed structure is currently used as storage for masonry (due to low fire risk) by London Borough of Camden and a fire suppression unit for the adjoining service tunnels which experienced a fire in 2015.

== In popular culture ==
- The remaining northern part of the subway is sometimes used in films, for example as itself in the Stephen Poliakoff film Hidden City, the secret entrance to the base in the film version of The Avengers and a railway tunnel in the film Bhowani Junction. It also appeared in The Escapist.
- In an episode of The Goon Show, Neddie Seagoon discovers that a long-lost tram has been hijacked by its driver Henry Crun and is hidden in the Kingsway tunnel.

== See also ==
- Conduit current collection
- Kingsway, London
