= London County Council Tramways =

London public street tramways operator (1899-1933)

The London County Council Tramways was an extensive network of public street tramways operated by the council throughout the County of London, UK, from 1899 to 1933, when they were taken over by the London Passenger Transport Board.

== Acquisition of tramways ==
Under the Tramways Act 1870 (33 & 34 Vict. c. 78) local authorities were permitted to acquire privately operated tramways in their area after they had been operating for twenty-one years. Accordingly, in October 1891 the LCC decided to exercise its option to take over four and a half miles of route operated by the London Street Tramways Company. The company disagreed with the price offered by the council, and the sale did not go through until 1 March 1895. As the LCC had no powers to operate tramways itself, it put the operation of the line out to tender, which the incumbent London Streetways won, being the only applicant.

In 1896 the London Street Tramways offered its network for sale to the county council, as did the North Metropolitan Tramways Company. The council purchased the lines, and the North Metropolitan was awarded a fourteen-year lease to operate them.

London County Tramways Act 1896
- Act of Parliament
- Parliament of the United Kingdom
- Long title: An Act to enable the London County Council to work their Tramways and for other purposes.
- Citation: 59 & 60 Vict. c. li

Dates
- Royal assent: 2 July 1896

Text of statute as originally enacted

The council succeeded in having the London County Tramways Act 1896 (59 & 60 Vict. c. li) passed, which gave it powers to operate trams. The next system to be acquired was that of the London Tramways Company in 1899, and from that date all lines taken over were operated by the county council itself. By 1909 most of the tramways in the county had been taken over, the LCC operating 113 miles (182 km) of tramways.

== Electrification ==
London County Tramways (Electrical Power) Act 1900
- Act of Parliament
- Parliament of the United Kingdom
- Long title: An Act to enable the London County Council to work their tramways by electrical power and for other purposes.
- Citation: 63 & 64 Vict. c. ccxxxviii

Dates
- Royal assent: 6 August 1900

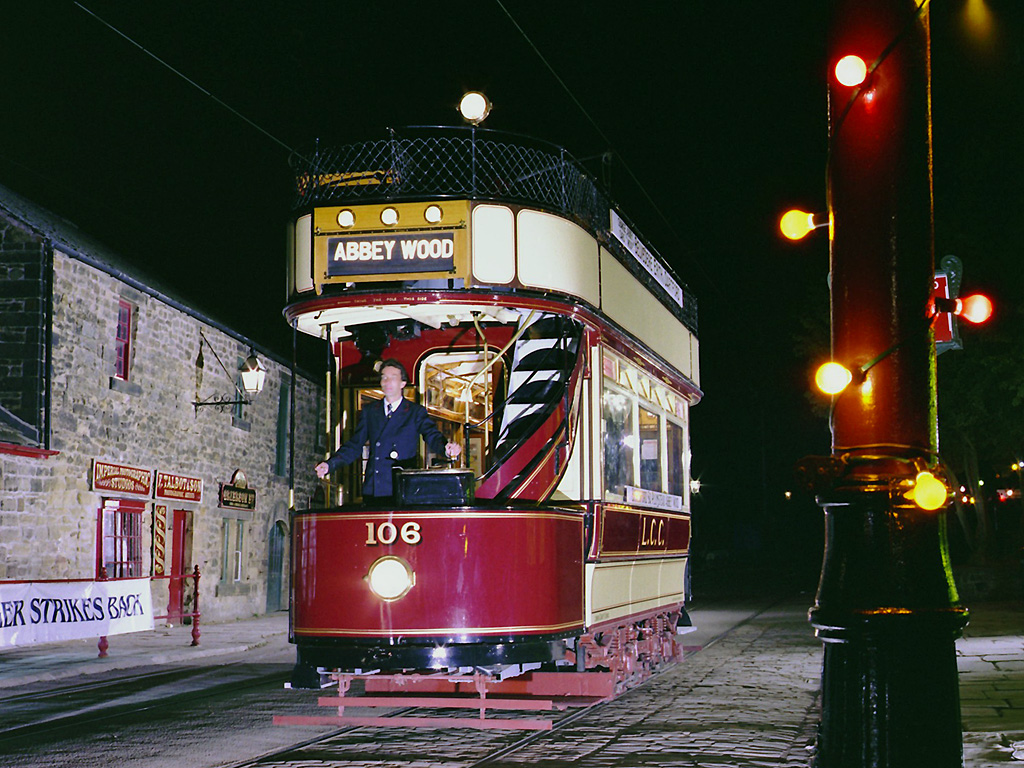
Preserved LCC tram car No. 106

A further act of Parliament, the London County Tramways (Electrical Power) Act 1900 (63 & 64 Vict. c. ccxxxviii), gave the council the power to electrify its system. On 15 May 1903 the first electrified section from Westminster to Tooting was opened by The Prince and Princess of Wales who rode the route in a specially decorated tramcar, and paid their fares with halfpenny coins minted for the occasion. The last horse tram ran on 30 April 1915. Much of the system used overhead power pickup, but also the conduit system of electric current, as the metropolitan boroughs had the power of veto on the installation of overhead wires.

== Expansion ==
The tramways north and south of the River Thames were almost completely separate until the opening of the Kingsway Subway in 1908.

From 1 July 1921 the LCC Tramways assumed operation of the Leyton Urban District Council Tramways trams.

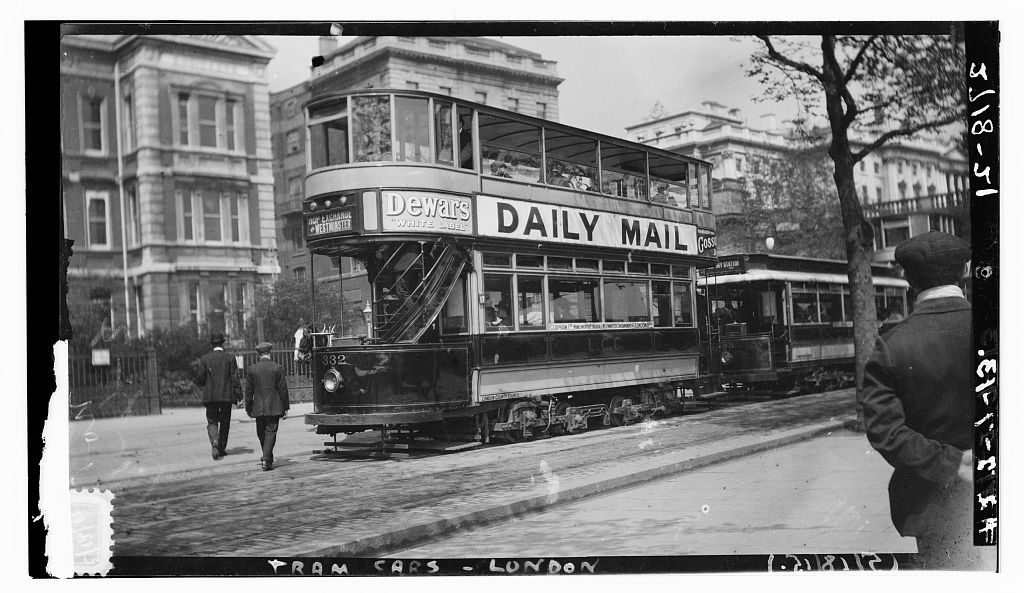
London Tram Car

In 1933, the LCC Tramways had 167 miles (269 km) of tracks in operation, of which about nine were in Leyton, and a quarter of a mile owned by the City of London. Much of Central London was never served by trams, these being excluded from the area by legislation passed in 1872.

LCC trams could also be seen outside the county of London. Apart from operating the Leyton system, there were connections and joint running arrangements with the neighbouring company and municipal systems. This brought council trams to Purley on the Croydon Corporation system, Barnet and Enfield on that of Metropolitan Electric Tramways, and Hampton Court on London United Tramways metals.

The council opened a coal-fired power station for the tramways on the Thames at Greenwich in 1906. As well as 22 tram depots around the county, refurbishment and maintenance works were opened at Charlton in 1909.

== Transfer to LPTB ==
On 1 July 1933, the London County Council Tramways passed to the London Passenger Transport Board (LPTB). However, the LCC tram management operated the large tram and small trolleybus fleet of London Transport at takeover and expanded the trolleybus fleet at the expense of the tram fleet, such that trams were virtually eliminated North of the Thames by 1940.

== Sources ==
- London's Trams and Trolleybuses, John R Day, published by London Transport in 1979
- South Metropolitan Electric Tramways: History
